

327001–327100 

|-bgcolor=#E9E9E9
| 327001 ||  || — || September 7, 2004 || Kitt Peak || Spacewatch || EUN || align=right | 1.3 km || 
|-id=002 bgcolor=#d6d6d6
| 327002 ||  || — || September 7, 2004 || Kitt Peak || Spacewatch || — || align=right | 3.0 km || 
|-id=003 bgcolor=#d6d6d6
| 327003 ||  || — || September 7, 2004 || Kitt Peak || Spacewatch || KAR || align=right | 1.3 km || 
|-id=004 bgcolor=#E9E9E9
| 327004 ||  || — || September 7, 2004 || Socorro || LINEAR || — || align=right | 2.3 km || 
|-id=005 bgcolor=#E9E9E9
| 327005 ||  || — || September 8, 2004 || Socorro || LINEAR || — || align=right | 1.7 km || 
|-id=006 bgcolor=#E9E9E9
| 327006 ||  || — || September 8, 2004 || Socorro || LINEAR || GEF || align=right | 1.4 km || 
|-id=007 bgcolor=#E9E9E9
| 327007 ||  || — || September 8, 2004 || Socorro || LINEAR || TIN || align=right | 1.1 km || 
|-id=008 bgcolor=#E9E9E9
| 327008 ||  || — || September 8, 2004 || Socorro || LINEAR || AGN || align=right | 1.3 km || 
|-id=009 bgcolor=#d6d6d6
| 327009 ||  || — || September 10, 2004 || Wrightwood || J. W. Young || BRA || align=right | 1.7 km || 
|-id=010 bgcolor=#E9E9E9
| 327010 ||  || — || September 8, 2004 || Socorro || LINEAR || — || align=right | 2.9 km || 
|-id=011 bgcolor=#E9E9E9
| 327011 ||  || — || September 8, 2004 || Socorro || LINEAR || — || align=right | 2.1 km || 
|-id=012 bgcolor=#d6d6d6
| 327012 ||  || — || September 7, 2004 || Palomar || NEAT || — || align=right | 3.4 km || 
|-id=013 bgcolor=#E9E9E9
| 327013 ||  || — || September 7, 2004 || Palomar || NEAT || — || align=right | 4.0 km || 
|-id=014 bgcolor=#E9E9E9
| 327014 ||  || — || September 8, 2004 || Socorro || LINEAR || — || align=right | 2.5 km || 
|-id=015 bgcolor=#E9E9E9
| 327015 ||  || — || September 9, 2004 || Socorro || LINEAR || GEF || align=right | 3.5 km || 
|-id=016 bgcolor=#d6d6d6
| 327016 ||  || — || September 8, 2004 || Palomar || NEAT || Tj (2.96) || align=right | 2.8 km || 
|-id=017 bgcolor=#E9E9E9
| 327017 ||  || — || September 10, 2004 || Socorro || LINEAR || — || align=right | 2.0 km || 
|-id=018 bgcolor=#E9E9E9
| 327018 ||  || — || September 10, 2004 || Socorro || LINEAR || — || align=right | 3.9 km || 
|-id=019 bgcolor=#E9E9E9
| 327019 ||  || — || September 12, 2004 || Kitt Peak || Spacewatch || WIT || align=right | 1.1 km || 
|-id=020 bgcolor=#E9E9E9
| 327020 ||  || — || September 11, 2004 || Socorro || LINEAR || JUN || align=right | 3.7 km || 
|-id=021 bgcolor=#E9E9E9
| 327021 ||  || — || September 11, 2004 || Socorro || LINEAR || — || align=right | 3.1 km || 
|-id=022 bgcolor=#E9E9E9
| 327022 ||  || — || September 11, 2004 || Socorro || LINEAR || — || align=right | 3.7 km || 
|-id=023 bgcolor=#E9E9E9
| 327023 ||  || — || September 11, 2004 || Socorro || LINEAR || — || align=right | 3.1 km || 
|-id=024 bgcolor=#E9E9E9
| 327024 ||  || — || September 9, 2004 || Socorro || LINEAR || — || align=right | 3.4 km || 
|-id=025 bgcolor=#E9E9E9
| 327025 ||  || — || September 9, 2004 || Kitt Peak || Spacewatch || — || align=right | 1.9 km || 
|-id=026 bgcolor=#E9E9E9
| 327026 ||  || — || September 10, 2004 || Kitt Peak || Spacewatch || HOF || align=right | 3.0 km || 
|-id=027 bgcolor=#E9E9E9
| 327027 ||  || — || September 10, 2004 || Kitt Peak || Spacewatch || AGN || align=right | 1.2 km || 
|-id=028 bgcolor=#E9E9E9
| 327028 ||  || — || September 10, 2004 || Kitt Peak || Spacewatch || EUN || align=right | 1.5 km || 
|-id=029 bgcolor=#E9E9E9
| 327029 ||  || — || September 6, 2004 || Palomar || NEAT || — || align=right | 3.1 km || 
|-id=030 bgcolor=#E9E9E9
| 327030 Alanmaclure ||  ||  || September 12, 2004 || Stony Ridge || Stony Ridge Obs. || — || align=right | 3.2 km || 
|-id=031 bgcolor=#E9E9E9
| 327031 ||  || — || September 5, 2004 || Siding Spring || SSS || — || align=right | 2.9 km || 
|-id=032 bgcolor=#E9E9E9
| 327032 ||  || — || September 15, 2004 || Kitt Peak || Spacewatch || — || align=right | 2.7 km || 
|-id=033 bgcolor=#d6d6d6
| 327033 ||  || — || September 13, 2004 || Socorro || LINEAR || — || align=right | 2.4 km || 
|-id=034 bgcolor=#E9E9E9
| 327034 ||  || — || September 13, 2004 || Socorro || LINEAR || — || align=right | 2.8 km || 
|-id=035 bgcolor=#E9E9E9
| 327035 ||  || — || September 15, 2004 || Anderson Mesa || LONEOS || — || align=right | 3.0 km || 
|-id=036 bgcolor=#d6d6d6
| 327036 ||  || — || September 11, 2004 || Kitt Peak || Spacewatch || — || align=right | 2.7 km || 
|-id=037 bgcolor=#d6d6d6
| 327037 ||  || — || September 10, 2004 || Socorro || LINEAR || EUP || align=right | 4.2 km || 
|-id=038 bgcolor=#d6d6d6
| 327038 ||  || — || September 12, 2004 || Kitt Peak || Spacewatch || — || align=right | 2.2 km || 
|-id=039 bgcolor=#E9E9E9
| 327039 ||  || — || September 4, 2004 || Palomar || NEAT || — || align=right | 2.9 km || 
|-id=040 bgcolor=#E9E9E9
| 327040 ||  || — || September 17, 2004 || Kitt Peak || Spacewatch || — || align=right | 2.5 km || 
|-id=041 bgcolor=#E9E9E9
| 327041 ||  || — || September 16, 2004 || Kitt Peak || Spacewatch || — || align=right | 2.9 km || 
|-id=042 bgcolor=#d6d6d6
| 327042 ||  || — || September 17, 2004 || Kitt Peak || Spacewatch || — || align=right | 2.1 km || 
|-id=043 bgcolor=#d6d6d6
| 327043 ||  || — || September 17, 2004 || Socorro || LINEAR || — || align=right | 3.5 km || 
|-id=044 bgcolor=#E9E9E9
| 327044 ||  || — || September 17, 2004 || Kitt Peak || Spacewatch || AGN || align=right | 1.2 km || 
|-id=045 bgcolor=#d6d6d6
| 327045 ||  || — || September 18, 2004 || Socorro || LINEAR || — || align=right | 5.2 km || 
|-id=046 bgcolor=#E9E9E9
| 327046 ||  || — || September 24, 2004 || Socorro || LINEAR || INO || align=right | 1.8 km || 
|-id=047 bgcolor=#d6d6d6
| 327047 ||  || — || October 4, 2004 || Kitt Peak || Spacewatch || — || align=right | 3.6 km || 
|-id=048 bgcolor=#d6d6d6
| 327048 ||  || — || October 4, 2004 || Kitt Peak || Spacewatch || — || align=right | 2.4 km || 
|-id=049 bgcolor=#d6d6d6
| 327049 ||  || — || October 4, 2004 || Kitt Peak || Spacewatch || — || align=right | 3.2 km || 
|-id=050 bgcolor=#d6d6d6
| 327050 ||  || — || October 4, 2004 || Kitt Peak || Spacewatch || — || align=right | 3.9 km || 
|-id=051 bgcolor=#E9E9E9
| 327051 ||  || — || October 4, 2004 || Kitt Peak || Spacewatch || — || align=right | 2.2 km || 
|-id=052 bgcolor=#d6d6d6
| 327052 ||  || — || October 5, 2004 || Anderson Mesa || LONEOS || — || align=right | 2.9 km || 
|-id=053 bgcolor=#E9E9E9
| 327053 ||  || — || October 6, 2004 || Kitt Peak || Spacewatch || — || align=right | 2.1 km || 
|-id=054 bgcolor=#d6d6d6
| 327054 ||  || — || October 5, 2004 || Kitt Peak || Spacewatch || — || align=right | 2.3 km || 
|-id=055 bgcolor=#d6d6d6
| 327055 ||  || — || October 5, 2004 || Kitt Peak || Spacewatch || KOR || align=right | 1.4 km || 
|-id=056 bgcolor=#d6d6d6
| 327056 ||  || — || October 5, 2004 || Kitt Peak || Spacewatch || — || align=right | 2.9 km || 
|-id=057 bgcolor=#d6d6d6
| 327057 ||  || — || October 4, 2004 || Kitt Peak || Spacewatch || — || align=right | 3.1 km || 
|-id=058 bgcolor=#E9E9E9
| 327058 ||  || — || October 5, 2004 || Kitt Peak || Spacewatch || GEF || align=right | 1.6 km || 
|-id=059 bgcolor=#d6d6d6
| 327059 ||  || — || September 23, 2004 || Kitt Peak || Spacewatch || — || align=right | 2.7 km || 
|-id=060 bgcolor=#d6d6d6
| 327060 ||  || — || September 23, 2004 || Kitt Peak || Spacewatch || — || align=right | 3.0 km || 
|-id=061 bgcolor=#E9E9E9
| 327061 ||  || — || October 6, 2004 || Kitt Peak || Spacewatch || — || align=right | 3.1 km || 
|-id=062 bgcolor=#d6d6d6
| 327062 ||  || — || October 7, 2004 || Kitt Peak || Spacewatch || — || align=right | 4.8 km || 
|-id=063 bgcolor=#d6d6d6
| 327063 ||  || — || October 7, 2004 || Kitt Peak || Spacewatch || EUP || align=right | 4.4 km || 
|-id=064 bgcolor=#d6d6d6
| 327064 ||  || — || October 7, 2004 || Kitt Peak || Spacewatch || — || align=right | 3.9 km || 
|-id=065 bgcolor=#d6d6d6
| 327065 ||  || — || October 7, 2004 || Kitt Peak || Spacewatch || — || align=right | 3.2 km || 
|-id=066 bgcolor=#d6d6d6
| 327066 ||  || — || October 10, 2004 || Kitt Peak || Spacewatch || CHA || align=right | 2.0 km || 
|-id=067 bgcolor=#d6d6d6
| 327067 ||  || — || October 8, 2004 || Kitt Peak || Spacewatch || — || align=right | 2.7 km || 
|-id=068 bgcolor=#d6d6d6
| 327068 ||  || — || October 10, 2004 || Kitt Peak || Spacewatch || — || align=right | 3.1 km || 
|-id=069 bgcolor=#d6d6d6
| 327069 ||  || — || October 10, 2004 || Socorro || LINEAR || EOS || align=right | 2.7 km || 
|-id=070 bgcolor=#d6d6d6
| 327070 ||  || — || October 10, 2004 || Socorro || LINEAR || — || align=right | 3.6 km || 
|-id=071 bgcolor=#E9E9E9
| 327071 ||  || — || October 14, 2004 || Anderson Mesa || LONEOS || INO || align=right | 1.5 km || 
|-id=072 bgcolor=#d6d6d6
| 327072 ||  || — || October 8, 2004 || Kitt Peak || Spacewatch || — || align=right | 3.3 km || 
|-id=073 bgcolor=#E9E9E9
| 327073 ||  || — || October 18, 2004 || Socorro || LINEAR || — || align=right | 2.9 km || 
|-id=074 bgcolor=#d6d6d6
| 327074 ||  || — || October 20, 2004 || Socorro || LINEAR || LIX || align=right | 4.4 km || 
|-id=075 bgcolor=#d6d6d6
| 327075 ||  || — || November 3, 2004 || Palomar || NEAT || — || align=right | 4.1 km || 
|-id=076 bgcolor=#E9E9E9
| 327076 ||  || — || November 2, 2004 || Palomar || NEAT || — || align=right | 3.0 km || 
|-id=077 bgcolor=#d6d6d6
| 327077 ||  || — || November 5, 2004 || Palomar || NEAT || — || align=right | 5.8 km || 
|-id=078 bgcolor=#d6d6d6
| 327078 ||  || — || November 3, 2004 || Kitt Peak || Spacewatch || EOS || align=right | 3.1 km || 
|-id=079 bgcolor=#d6d6d6
| 327079 ||  || — || November 3, 2004 || Kitt Peak || Spacewatch || — || align=right | 4.0 km || 
|-id=080 bgcolor=#d6d6d6
| 327080 ||  || — || November 4, 2004 || Kitt Peak || Spacewatch || — || align=right | 3.1 km || 
|-id=081 bgcolor=#d6d6d6
| 327081 ||  || — || November 4, 2004 || Kitt Peak || Spacewatch || THM || align=right | 2.4 km || 
|-id=082 bgcolor=#d6d6d6
| 327082 Tournesol ||  ||  || November 10, 2004 || Nogales || M. Ory || — || align=right | 3.1 km || 
|-id=083 bgcolor=#d6d6d6
| 327083 ||  || — || November 10, 2004 || Kitt Peak || Spacewatch || HYG || align=right | 3.4 km || 
|-id=084 bgcolor=#d6d6d6
| 327084 ||  || — || November 10, 2004 || Kitt Peak || Spacewatch || — || align=right | 3.1 km || 
|-id=085 bgcolor=#d6d6d6
| 327085 ||  || — || November 11, 2004 || Kitt Peak || Spacewatch || — || align=right | 4.2 km || 
|-id=086 bgcolor=#d6d6d6
| 327086 ||  || — || November 19, 2004 || Catalina || CSS || — || align=right | 4.1 km || 
|-id=087 bgcolor=#FA8072
| 327087 ||  || — || December 1, 2004 || Catalina || CSS || — || align=right | 1.9 km || 
|-id=088 bgcolor=#d6d6d6
| 327088 ||  || — || December 2, 2004 || Palomar || NEAT || — || align=right | 4.4 km || 
|-id=089 bgcolor=#d6d6d6
| 327089 ||  || — || December 10, 2004 || Desert Moon || B. L. Stevens || — || align=right | 3.2 km || 
|-id=090 bgcolor=#d6d6d6
| 327090 ||  || — || December 8, 2004 || Socorro || LINEAR || — || align=right | 5.6 km || 
|-id=091 bgcolor=#d6d6d6
| 327091 ||  || — || December 9, 2004 || Kitt Peak || Spacewatch || — || align=right | 3.6 km || 
|-id=092 bgcolor=#d6d6d6
| 327092 ||  || — || December 9, 2004 || Kitt Peak || Spacewatch || — || align=right | 4.0 km || 
|-id=093 bgcolor=#d6d6d6
| 327093 ||  || — || December 9, 2004 || Catalina || CSS || LIX || align=right | 6.0 km || 
|-id=094 bgcolor=#d6d6d6
| 327094 ||  || — || December 10, 2004 || Socorro || LINEAR || EUP || align=right | 4.4 km || 
|-id=095 bgcolor=#d6d6d6
| 327095 ||  || — || December 10, 2004 || Kitt Peak || Spacewatch || EOS || align=right | 2.5 km || 
|-id=096 bgcolor=#d6d6d6
| 327096 ||  || — || December 11, 2004 || Kitt Peak || Spacewatch || VER || align=right | 3.8 km || 
|-id=097 bgcolor=#d6d6d6
| 327097 ||  || — || December 11, 2004 || Kitt Peak || Spacewatch || URS || align=right | 4.5 km || 
|-id=098 bgcolor=#d6d6d6
| 327098 ||  || — || December 13, 2004 || Kitt Peak || Spacewatch || — || align=right | 4.8 km || 
|-id=099 bgcolor=#fefefe
| 327099 ||  || — || December 13, 2004 || Campo Imperatore || CINEOS || — || align=right data-sort-value="0.71" | 710 m || 
|-id=100 bgcolor=#d6d6d6
| 327100 ||  || — || December 14, 2004 || Kitt Peak || Spacewatch || EOS || align=right | 2.4 km || 
|}

327101–327200 

|-bgcolor=#d6d6d6
| 327101 ||  || — || December 14, 2004 || Socorro || LINEAR || — || align=right | 3.9 km || 
|-id=102 bgcolor=#fefefe
| 327102 ||  || — || December 14, 2004 || Kitt Peak || Spacewatch || FLO || align=right data-sort-value="0.45" | 450 m || 
|-id=103 bgcolor=#d6d6d6
| 327103 ||  || — || January 6, 2005 || Socorro || LINEAR || — || align=right | 5.5 km || 
|-id=104 bgcolor=#fefefe
| 327104 ||  || — || January 13, 2005 || Kitt Peak || Spacewatch || — || align=right data-sort-value="0.68" | 680 m || 
|-id=105 bgcolor=#d6d6d6
| 327105 ||  || — || September 28, 2003 || Anderson Mesa || LONEOS || EOS || align=right | 2.9 km || 
|-id=106 bgcolor=#fefefe
| 327106 ||  || — || January 13, 2005 || Kitt Peak || Spacewatch || FLO || align=right data-sort-value="0.77" | 770 m || 
|-id=107 bgcolor=#d6d6d6
| 327107 ||  || — || December 19, 2004 || Mount Lemmon || Mount Lemmon Survey || — || align=right | 4.5 km || 
|-id=108 bgcolor=#d6d6d6
| 327108 ||  || — || January 20, 2005 || Socorro || LINEAR || Tj (2.93) || align=right | 4.9 km || 
|-id=109 bgcolor=#fefefe
| 327109 ||  || — || January 16, 2005 || Kitt Peak || Spacewatch || — || align=right data-sort-value="0.99" | 990 m || 
|-id=110 bgcolor=#fefefe
| 327110 ||  || — || December 20, 2004 || Mount Lemmon || Mount Lemmon Survey || — || align=right data-sort-value="0.96" | 960 m || 
|-id=111 bgcolor=#fefefe
| 327111 ||  || — || February 2, 2005 || Kitt Peak || Spacewatch || — || align=right data-sort-value="0.72" | 720 m || 
|-id=112 bgcolor=#fefefe
| 327112 ||  || — || February 2, 2005 || Kitt Peak || Spacewatch || — || align=right data-sort-value="0.90" | 900 m || 
|-id=113 bgcolor=#fefefe
| 327113 ||  || — || February 9, 2005 || Mount Lemmon || Mount Lemmon Survey || — || align=right | 1.0 km || 
|-id=114 bgcolor=#fefefe
| 327114 ||  || — || March 1, 2005 || Kitt Peak || Spacewatch || FLO || align=right data-sort-value="0.99" | 990 m || 
|-id=115 bgcolor=#FA8072
| 327115 ||  || — || March 3, 2005 || Catalina || CSS || — || align=right data-sort-value="0.99" | 990 m || 
|-id=116 bgcolor=#fefefe
| 327116 ||  || — || March 4, 2005 || Kitt Peak || Spacewatch || — || align=right data-sort-value="0.72" | 720 m || 
|-id=117 bgcolor=#d6d6d6
| 327117 ||  || — || March 4, 2005 || Mount Lemmon || Mount Lemmon Survey || 7:4 || align=right | 3.3 km || 
|-id=118 bgcolor=#fefefe
| 327118 ||  || — || March 4, 2005 || Mount Lemmon || Mount Lemmon Survey || — || align=right data-sort-value="0.65" | 650 m || 
|-id=119 bgcolor=#d6d6d6
| 327119 ||  || — || March 4, 2005 || Kitt Peak || Spacewatch || — || align=right | 4.1 km || 
|-id=120 bgcolor=#fefefe
| 327120 ||  || — || March 8, 2005 || Kitt Peak || Spacewatch || — || align=right | 1.1 km || 
|-id=121 bgcolor=#fefefe
| 327121 ||  || — || March 4, 2005 || Kitt Peak || Spacewatch || FLO || align=right data-sort-value="0.72" | 720 m || 
|-id=122 bgcolor=#fefefe
| 327122 ||  || — || March 9, 2005 || Mount Lemmon || Mount Lemmon Survey || — || align=right data-sort-value="0.78" | 780 m || 
|-id=123 bgcolor=#fefefe
| 327123 ||  || — || March 10, 2005 || Mount Lemmon || Mount Lemmon Survey || — || align=right data-sort-value="0.71" | 710 m || 
|-id=124 bgcolor=#fefefe
| 327124 ||  || — || March 10, 2005 || Mount Lemmon || Mount Lemmon Survey || — || align=right data-sort-value="0.81" | 810 m || 
|-id=125 bgcolor=#fefefe
| 327125 ||  || — || March 10, 2005 || Mount Lemmon || Mount Lemmon Survey || — || align=right data-sort-value="0.81" | 810 m || 
|-id=126 bgcolor=#fefefe
| 327126 ||  || — || March 10, 2005 || Kitt Peak || Spacewatch || — || align=right data-sort-value="0.98" | 980 m || 
|-id=127 bgcolor=#fefefe
| 327127 ||  || — || March 10, 2005 || Kitt Peak || Spacewatch || — || align=right data-sort-value="0.98" | 980 m || 
|-id=128 bgcolor=#fefefe
| 327128 ||  || — || March 10, 2005 || Kitt Peak || Spacewatch || — || align=right data-sort-value="0.93" | 930 m || 
|-id=129 bgcolor=#fefefe
| 327129 ||  || — || March 10, 2005 || Kitt Peak || Spacewatch || NYS || align=right data-sort-value="0.73" | 730 m || 
|-id=130 bgcolor=#fefefe
| 327130 ||  || — || March 10, 2005 || Kitt Peak || Spacewatch || FLO || align=right data-sort-value="0.63" | 630 m || 
|-id=131 bgcolor=#fefefe
| 327131 ||  || — || March 11, 2005 || Catalina || CSS || FLO || align=right data-sort-value="0.84" | 840 m || 
|-id=132 bgcolor=#fefefe
| 327132 ||  || — || March 9, 2005 || Anderson Mesa || LONEOS || FLO || align=right data-sort-value="0.72" | 720 m || 
|-id=133 bgcolor=#fefefe
| 327133 ||  || — || March 9, 2005 || Kitt Peak || Spacewatch || NYS || align=right data-sort-value="0.58" | 580 m || 
|-id=134 bgcolor=#fefefe
| 327134 ||  || — || March 10, 2005 || Anderson Mesa || LONEOS || — || align=right data-sort-value="0.86" | 860 m || 
|-id=135 bgcolor=#fefefe
| 327135 ||  || — || March 11, 2005 || Mount Lemmon || Mount Lemmon Survey || FLO || align=right data-sort-value="0.66" | 660 m || 
|-id=136 bgcolor=#fefefe
| 327136 ||  || — || March 11, 2005 || Mount Lemmon || Mount Lemmon Survey || — || align=right | 1.1 km || 
|-id=137 bgcolor=#fefefe
| 327137 ||  || — || March 13, 2005 || Kitt Peak || Spacewatch || — || align=right data-sort-value="0.65" | 650 m || 
|-id=138 bgcolor=#fefefe
| 327138 ||  || — || March 4, 2005 || Mount Lemmon || Mount Lemmon Survey || NYS || align=right data-sort-value="0.55" | 550 m || 
|-id=139 bgcolor=#fefefe
| 327139 ||  || — || March 4, 2005 || Mount Lemmon || Mount Lemmon Survey || — || align=right data-sort-value="0.86" | 860 m || 
|-id=140 bgcolor=#FFC2E0
| 327140 ||  || — || March 15, 2005 || Mount Lemmon || Mount Lemmon Survey || AMOcritical || align=right data-sort-value="0.37" | 370 m || 
|-id=141 bgcolor=#fefefe
| 327141 ||  || — || March 13, 2005 || Kitt Peak || Spacewatch || — || align=right data-sort-value="0.82" | 820 m || 
|-id=142 bgcolor=#fefefe
| 327142 ||  || — || March 11, 2005 || Mount Lemmon || Mount Lemmon Survey || FLO || align=right data-sort-value="0.65" | 650 m || 
|-id=143 bgcolor=#fefefe
| 327143 ||  || — || March 13, 2005 || Kitt Peak || Spacewatch || NYS || align=right data-sort-value="0.68" | 680 m || 
|-id=144 bgcolor=#fefefe
| 327144 ||  || — || March 13, 2005 || Kitt Peak || Spacewatch || FLO || align=right data-sort-value="0.61" | 610 m || 
|-id=145 bgcolor=#fefefe
| 327145 ||  || — || April 1, 2005 || Kitt Peak || Spacewatch || NYS || align=right data-sort-value="0.86" | 860 m || 
|-id=146 bgcolor=#fefefe
| 327146 ||  || — || April 2, 2005 || Mount Lemmon || Mount Lemmon Survey || — || align=right data-sort-value="0.88" | 880 m || 
|-id=147 bgcolor=#fefefe
| 327147 ||  || — || April 4, 2005 || Socorro || LINEAR || PHO || align=right data-sort-value="0.98" | 980 m || 
|-id=148 bgcolor=#fefefe
| 327148 ||  || — || April 5, 2005 || Palomar || NEAT || — || align=right data-sort-value="0.94" | 940 m || 
|-id=149 bgcolor=#fefefe
| 327149 ||  || — || April 5, 2005 || Mount Lemmon || Mount Lemmon Survey || — || align=right data-sort-value="0.77" | 770 m || 
|-id=150 bgcolor=#fefefe
| 327150 ||  || — || March 13, 2005 || Mount Lemmon || Mount Lemmon Survey || FLO || align=right data-sort-value="0.68" | 680 m || 
|-id=151 bgcolor=#fefefe
| 327151 ||  || — || April 4, 2005 || Mount Lemmon || Mount Lemmon Survey || — || align=right data-sort-value="0.71" | 710 m || 
|-id=152 bgcolor=#fefefe
| 327152 ||  || — || April 4, 2005 || Mount Lemmon || Mount Lemmon Survey || — || align=right data-sort-value="0.91" | 910 m || 
|-id=153 bgcolor=#fefefe
| 327153 ||  || — || April 4, 2005 || Kitt Peak || Spacewatch || PHO || align=right | 1.3 km || 
|-id=154 bgcolor=#fefefe
| 327154 ||  || — || April 6, 2005 || Mount Lemmon || Mount Lemmon Survey || V || align=right data-sort-value="0.87" | 870 m || 
|-id=155 bgcolor=#fefefe
| 327155 ||  || — || April 9, 2005 || Mount Lemmon || Mount Lemmon Survey || — || align=right data-sort-value="0.94" | 940 m || 
|-id=156 bgcolor=#fefefe
| 327156 ||  || — || April 9, 2005 || Socorro || LINEAR || — || align=right data-sort-value="0.95" | 950 m || 
|-id=157 bgcolor=#fefefe
| 327157 ||  || — || April 11, 2005 || Mount Lemmon || Mount Lemmon Survey || V || align=right data-sort-value="0.71" | 710 m || 
|-id=158 bgcolor=#fefefe
| 327158 ||  || — || April 12, 2005 || Anderson Mesa || LONEOS || — || align=right | 1.3 km || 
|-id=159 bgcolor=#fefefe
| 327159 ||  || — || April 10, 2005 || Mount Lemmon || Mount Lemmon Survey || — || align=right data-sort-value="0.77" | 770 m || 
|-id=160 bgcolor=#fefefe
| 327160 ||  || — || April 11, 2005 || Mount Lemmon || Mount Lemmon Survey || V || align=right data-sort-value="0.71" | 710 m || 
|-id=161 bgcolor=#fefefe
| 327161 ||  || — || April 16, 2005 || Kitt Peak || Spacewatch || — || align=right data-sort-value="0.65" | 650 m || 
|-id=162 bgcolor=#fefefe
| 327162 ||  || — || April 30, 2005 || Kitt Peak || Spacewatch || — || align=right | 1.0 km || 
|-id=163 bgcolor=#fefefe
| 327163 ||  || — || May 2, 2005 || Kitt Peak || Spacewatch || — || align=right data-sort-value="0.91" | 910 m || 
|-id=164 bgcolor=#fefefe
| 327164 ||  || — || May 3, 2005 || Kitt Peak || Spacewatch || — || align=right data-sort-value="0.78" | 780 m || 
|-id=165 bgcolor=#fefefe
| 327165 ||  || — || May 3, 2005 || Socorro || LINEAR || — || align=right | 1.0 km || 
|-id=166 bgcolor=#fefefe
| 327166 ||  || — || May 7, 2005 || Kitt Peak || Spacewatch || MAS || align=right data-sort-value="0.77" | 770 m || 
|-id=167 bgcolor=#fefefe
| 327167 ||  || — || May 3, 2005 || Kitt Peak || Spacewatch || NYS || align=right data-sort-value="0.52" | 520 m || 
|-id=168 bgcolor=#fefefe
| 327168 ||  || — || May 8, 2005 || Anderson Mesa || LONEOS || — || align=right data-sort-value="0.87" | 870 m || 
|-id=169 bgcolor=#fefefe
| 327169 ||  || — || May 11, 2005 || Palomar || NEAT || PHO || align=right | 1.2 km || 
|-id=170 bgcolor=#fefefe
| 327170 ||  || — || May 8, 2005 || Mount Lemmon || Mount Lemmon Survey || V || align=right data-sort-value="0.54" | 540 m || 
|-id=171 bgcolor=#fefefe
| 327171 ||  || — || May 8, 2005 || Mount Lemmon || Mount Lemmon Survey || — || align=right data-sort-value="0.73" | 730 m || 
|-id=172 bgcolor=#FA8072
| 327172 ||  || — || May 11, 2005 || Anderson Mesa || LONEOS || — || align=right data-sort-value="0.83" | 830 m || 
|-id=173 bgcolor=#fefefe
| 327173 ||  || — || May 11, 2005 || Mount Lemmon || Mount Lemmon Survey || — || align=right data-sort-value="0.86" | 860 m || 
|-id=174 bgcolor=#fefefe
| 327174 ||  || — || May 10, 2005 || Kitt Peak || Spacewatch || — || align=right data-sort-value="0.86" | 860 m || 
|-id=175 bgcolor=#fefefe
| 327175 ||  || — || May 10, 2005 || Kitt Peak || Spacewatch || — || align=right data-sort-value="0.98" | 980 m || 
|-id=176 bgcolor=#fefefe
| 327176 ||  || — || May 12, 2005 || Socorro || LINEAR || NYS || align=right data-sort-value="0.76" | 760 m || 
|-id=177 bgcolor=#fefefe
| 327177 ||  || — || May 14, 2005 || Mount Lemmon || Mount Lemmon Survey || NYS || align=right data-sort-value="0.63" | 630 m || 
|-id=178 bgcolor=#fefefe
| 327178 ||  || — || May 20, 2005 || Mount Lemmon || Mount Lemmon Survey || NYS || align=right data-sort-value="0.88" | 880 m || 
|-id=179 bgcolor=#fefefe
| 327179 ||  || — || May 19, 2005 || Mount Lemmon || Mount Lemmon Survey || NYS || align=right data-sort-value="0.92" | 920 m || 
|-id=180 bgcolor=#fefefe
| 327180 ||  || — || June 2, 2005 || Catalina || CSS || V || align=right data-sort-value="0.73" | 730 m || 
|-id=181 bgcolor=#fefefe
| 327181 ||  || — || June 8, 2005 || Kitt Peak || Spacewatch || — || align=right | 1.2 km || 
|-id=182 bgcolor=#fefefe
| 327182 ||  || — || June 8, 2005 || Kitt Peak || Spacewatch || V || align=right data-sort-value="0.68" | 680 m || 
|-id=183 bgcolor=#fefefe
| 327183 ||  || — || May 13, 2005 || Kitt Peak || Spacewatch || — || align=right data-sort-value="0.96" | 960 m || 
|-id=184 bgcolor=#fefefe
| 327184 ||  || — || June 13, 2005 || Mount Lemmon || Mount Lemmon Survey || NYS || align=right data-sort-value="0.60" | 600 m || 
|-id=185 bgcolor=#fefefe
| 327185 ||  || — || June 13, 2005 || Mount Lemmon || Mount Lemmon Survey || NYS || align=right data-sort-value="0.63" | 630 m || 
|-id=186 bgcolor=#fefefe
| 327186 ||  || — || June 13, 2005 || Mount Lemmon || Mount Lemmon Survey || NYS || align=right data-sort-value="0.96" | 960 m || 
|-id=187 bgcolor=#fefefe
| 327187 ||  || — || June 13, 2005 || Mount Lemmon || Mount Lemmon Survey || NYS || align=right data-sort-value="0.77" | 770 m || 
|-id=188 bgcolor=#fefefe
| 327188 ||  || — || June 27, 2005 || Junk Bond || D. Healy || — || align=right | 1.1 km || 
|-id=189 bgcolor=#fefefe
| 327189 ||  || — || June 27, 2005 || Mount Lemmon || Mount Lemmon Survey || V || align=right data-sort-value="0.79" | 790 m || 
|-id=190 bgcolor=#fefefe
| 327190 ||  || — || June 27, 2005 || Kitt Peak || Spacewatch || — || align=right | 1.1 km || 
|-id=191 bgcolor=#fefefe
| 327191 ||  || — || June 28, 2005 || Palomar || NEAT || MAS || align=right data-sort-value="0.74" | 740 m || 
|-id=192 bgcolor=#fefefe
| 327192 ||  || — || June 30, 2005 || Kitt Peak || Spacewatch || — || align=right | 1.2 km || 
|-id=193 bgcolor=#fefefe
| 327193 ||  || — || June 29, 2005 || Kitt Peak || Spacewatch || — || align=right | 1.1 km || 
|-id=194 bgcolor=#fefefe
| 327194 ||  || — || June 29, 2005 || Kitt Peak || Spacewatch || — || align=right data-sort-value="0.96" | 960 m || 
|-id=195 bgcolor=#fefefe
| 327195 ||  || — || June 29, 2005 || Palomar || NEAT || — || align=right data-sort-value="0.96" | 960 m || 
|-id=196 bgcolor=#fefefe
| 327196 ||  || — || June 29, 2005 || Kitt Peak || Spacewatch || — || align=right data-sort-value="0.87" | 870 m || 
|-id=197 bgcolor=#E9E9E9
| 327197 ||  || — || June 30, 2005 || Kitt Peak || Spacewatch || — || align=right | 1.0 km || 
|-id=198 bgcolor=#fefefe
| 327198 ||  || — || June 20, 2005 || Palomar || NEAT || — || align=right | 1.4 km || 
|-id=199 bgcolor=#fefefe
| 327199 ||  || — || July 2, 2005 || Kitt Peak || Spacewatch || NYS || align=right data-sort-value="0.66" | 660 m || 
|-id=200 bgcolor=#fefefe
| 327200 ||  || — || July 1, 2005 || Kitt Peak || Spacewatch || — || align=right | 1.0 km || 
|}

327201–327300 

|-bgcolor=#fefefe
| 327201 ||  || — || July 2, 2005 || Kitt Peak || Spacewatch || NYS || align=right data-sort-value="0.86" | 860 m || 
|-id=202 bgcolor=#fefefe
| 327202 ||  || — || July 3, 2005 || Mount Lemmon || Mount Lemmon Survey || MAS || align=right data-sort-value="0.90" | 900 m || 
|-id=203 bgcolor=#fefefe
| 327203 ||  || — || July 3, 2005 || Mount Lemmon || Mount Lemmon Survey || MAS || align=right data-sort-value="0.80" | 800 m || 
|-id=204 bgcolor=#fefefe
| 327204 ||  || — || July 5, 2005 || Mount Lemmon || Mount Lemmon Survey || MAS || align=right data-sort-value="0.78" | 780 m || 
|-id=205 bgcolor=#fefefe
| 327205 ||  || — || July 10, 2005 || Catalina || CSS || — || align=right | 1.3 km || 
|-id=206 bgcolor=#fefefe
| 327206 ||  || — || July 2, 2005 || Kitt Peak || Spacewatch || MAS || align=right data-sort-value="0.77" | 770 m || 
|-id=207 bgcolor=#fefefe
| 327207 ||  || — || July 4, 2005 || Palomar || NEAT || MAS || align=right data-sort-value="0.76" | 760 m || 
|-id=208 bgcolor=#fefefe
| 327208 ||  || — || July 15, 2005 || Kitt Peak || Spacewatch || — || align=right data-sort-value="0.95" | 950 m || 
|-id=209 bgcolor=#fefefe
| 327209 ||  || — || July 5, 2005 || Mount Lemmon || Mount Lemmon Survey || V || align=right data-sort-value="0.76" | 760 m || 
|-id=210 bgcolor=#fefefe
| 327210 ||  || — || July 11, 2005 || Kitt Peak || Spacewatch || MAS || align=right data-sort-value="0.78" | 780 m || 
|-id=211 bgcolor=#fefefe
| 327211 ||  || — || July 4, 2005 || Palomar || NEAT || — || align=right data-sort-value="0.71" | 710 m || 
|-id=212 bgcolor=#fefefe
| 327212 ||  || — || July 4, 2005 || Campo Imperatore || CINEOS || — || align=right | 1.2 km || 
|-id=213 bgcolor=#fefefe
| 327213 ||  || — || July 10, 2005 || Siding Spring || SSS || V || align=right data-sort-value="0.91" | 910 m || 
|-id=214 bgcolor=#fefefe
| 327214 ||  || — || July 26, 2005 || Palomar || NEAT || — || align=right | 1.1 km || 
|-id=215 bgcolor=#fefefe
| 327215 ||  || — || July 30, 2005 || Palomar || NEAT || LCI || align=right | 1.00 km || 
|-id=216 bgcolor=#fefefe
| 327216 ||  || — || July 30, 2005 || Palomar || NEAT || V || align=right data-sort-value="0.65" | 650 m || 
|-id=217 bgcolor=#E9E9E9
| 327217 ||  || — || July 31, 2005 || Palomar || NEAT || — || align=right | 1.2 km || 
|-id=218 bgcolor=#E9E9E9
| 327218 ||  || — || July 30, 2005 || Palomar || NEAT || — || align=right | 1.0 km || 
|-id=219 bgcolor=#fefefe
| 327219 ||  || — || August 6, 2005 || Palomar || NEAT || — || align=right | 1.3 km || 
|-id=220 bgcolor=#fefefe
| 327220 || 2005 QO || — || August 22, 2005 || Haleakala || NEAT || — || align=right | 1.1 km || 
|-id=221 bgcolor=#E9E9E9
| 327221 ||  || — || August 27, 2005 || Kitt Peak || Spacewatch || — || align=right | 1.6 km || 
|-id=222 bgcolor=#fefefe
| 327222 ||  || — || August 27, 2005 || Kanab || E. E. Sheridan || NYS || align=right data-sort-value="0.86" | 860 m || 
|-id=223 bgcolor=#fefefe
| 327223 ||  || — || August 26, 2005 || Palomar || NEAT || — || align=right | 1.2 km || 
|-id=224 bgcolor=#E9E9E9
| 327224 ||  || — || August 25, 2005 || Palomar || NEAT || — || align=right | 1.6 km || 
|-id=225 bgcolor=#E9E9E9
| 327225 ||  || — || August 27, 2005 || Palomar || NEAT || — || align=right | 1.1 km || 
|-id=226 bgcolor=#fefefe
| 327226 ||  || — || August 27, 2005 || Palomar || NEAT || — || align=right data-sort-value="0.93" | 930 m || 
|-id=227 bgcolor=#fefefe
| 327227 ||  || — || August 27, 2005 || Palomar || NEAT || — || align=right | 1.1 km || 
|-id=228 bgcolor=#E9E9E9
| 327228 ||  || — || August 27, 2005 || Palomar || NEAT || — || align=right | 1.0 km || 
|-id=229 bgcolor=#fefefe
| 327229 ||  || — || August 28, 2005 || Kitt Peak || Spacewatch || MAS || align=right data-sort-value="0.75" | 750 m || 
|-id=230 bgcolor=#fefefe
| 327230 ||  || — || August 28, 2005 || Anderson Mesa || LONEOS || — || align=right | 2.5 km || 
|-id=231 bgcolor=#E9E9E9
| 327231 ||  || — || August 27, 2005 || Anderson Mesa || LONEOS || — || align=right | 1.2 km || 
|-id=232 bgcolor=#E9E9E9
| 327232 ||  || — || August 31, 2005 || Kitt Peak || Spacewatch || GEF || align=right | 1.6 km || 
|-id=233 bgcolor=#fefefe
| 327233 ||  || — || August 27, 2005 || Palomar || NEAT || NYS || align=right data-sort-value="0.64" | 640 m || 
|-id=234 bgcolor=#E9E9E9
| 327234 ||  || — || September 1, 2005 || Kitt Peak || Spacewatch || — || align=right | 1.3 km || 
|-id=235 bgcolor=#fefefe
| 327235 ||  || — || September 6, 2005 || Anderson Mesa || LONEOS || — || align=right | 1.3 km || 
|-id=236 bgcolor=#E9E9E9
| 327236 ||  || — || September 14, 2005 || Apache Point || A. C. Becker || RAF || align=right data-sort-value="0.87" | 870 m || 
|-id=237 bgcolor=#E9E9E9
| 327237 ||  || — || September 14, 2005 || Apache Point || A. C. Becker || AER || align=right | 1.3 km || 
|-id=238 bgcolor=#E9E9E9
| 327238 ||  || — || September 14, 2005 || Apache Point || A. C. Becker || — || align=right | 3.2 km || 
|-id=239 bgcolor=#E9E9E9
| 327239 ||  || — || September 26, 2005 || Kitt Peak || Spacewatch || — || align=right | 1.9 km || 
|-id=240 bgcolor=#E9E9E9
| 327240 ||  || — || September 24, 2005 || Kitt Peak || Spacewatch || — || align=right | 2.1 km || 
|-id=241 bgcolor=#fefefe
| 327241 ||  || — || September 27, 2005 || Palomar || NEAT || — || align=right | 1.5 km || 
|-id=242 bgcolor=#E9E9E9
| 327242 ||  || — || September 23, 2005 || Kitt Peak || Spacewatch || 526 || align=right | 2.8 km || 
|-id=243 bgcolor=#E9E9E9
| 327243 ||  || — || September 23, 2005 || Kitt Peak || Spacewatch || — || align=right | 1.1 km || 
|-id=244 bgcolor=#E9E9E9
| 327244 ||  || — || September 24, 2005 || Kitt Peak || Spacewatch || — || align=right data-sort-value="0.88" | 880 m || 
|-id=245 bgcolor=#E9E9E9
| 327245 ||  || — || September 24, 2005 || Kitt Peak || Spacewatch || — || align=right data-sort-value="0.97" | 970 m || 
|-id=246 bgcolor=#E9E9E9
| 327246 ||  || — || September 24, 2005 || Kitt Peak || Spacewatch || — || align=right | 2.2 km || 
|-id=247 bgcolor=#E9E9E9
| 327247 ||  || — || September 24, 2005 || Kitt Peak || Spacewatch || HEN || align=right | 1.1 km || 
|-id=248 bgcolor=#E9E9E9
| 327248 ||  || — || September 25, 2005 || Catalina || CSS || EUN || align=right | 1.4 km || 
|-id=249 bgcolor=#E9E9E9
| 327249 ||  || — || August 31, 2005 || Palomar || NEAT || — || align=right | 2.1 km || 
|-id=250 bgcolor=#E9E9E9
| 327250 ||  || — || September 25, 2005 || Kitt Peak || Spacewatch || — || align=right | 1.8 km || 
|-id=251 bgcolor=#E9E9E9
| 327251 ||  || — || September 25, 2005 || Palomar || NEAT || — || align=right | 2.2 km || 
|-id=252 bgcolor=#E9E9E9
| 327252 ||  || — || September 25, 2005 || Kitt Peak || Spacewatch || — || align=right | 2.8 km || 
|-id=253 bgcolor=#E9E9E9
| 327253 ||  || — || September 25, 2005 || Kitt Peak || Spacewatch || — || align=right | 1.6 km || 
|-id=254 bgcolor=#E9E9E9
| 327254 ||  || — || September 25, 2005 || Kitt Peak || Spacewatch || — || align=right | 2.5 km || 
|-id=255 bgcolor=#E9E9E9
| 327255 ||  || — || September 26, 2005 || Kitt Peak || Spacewatch || — || align=right | 1.4 km || 
|-id=256 bgcolor=#fefefe
| 327256 ||  || — || September 27, 2005 || Palomar || NEAT || H || align=right data-sort-value="0.67" | 670 m || 
|-id=257 bgcolor=#E9E9E9
| 327257 ||  || — || September 28, 2005 || Palomar || NEAT || KON || align=right | 2.7 km || 
|-id=258 bgcolor=#fefefe
| 327258 ||  || — || September 28, 2005 || Palomar || NEAT || — || align=right data-sort-value="0.94" | 940 m || 
|-id=259 bgcolor=#E9E9E9
| 327259 ||  || — || September 29, 2005 || Kitt Peak || Spacewatch || — || align=right | 1.5 km || 
|-id=260 bgcolor=#E9E9E9
| 327260 ||  || — || September 29, 2005 || Kitt Peak || Spacewatch || MAR || align=right data-sort-value="0.86" | 860 m || 
|-id=261 bgcolor=#FA8072
| 327261 ||  || — || September 29, 2005 || Palomar || NEAT || H || align=right data-sort-value="0.82" | 820 m || 
|-id=262 bgcolor=#E9E9E9
| 327262 ||  || — || September 29, 2005 || Kitt Peak || Spacewatch || NEM || align=right | 2.7 km || 
|-id=263 bgcolor=#E9E9E9
| 327263 ||  || — || September 25, 2005 || Kitt Peak || Spacewatch || — || align=right data-sort-value="0.95" | 950 m || 
|-id=264 bgcolor=#E9E9E9
| 327264 ||  || — || September 28, 2005 || Palomar || NEAT || — || align=right | 3.3 km || 
|-id=265 bgcolor=#E9E9E9
| 327265 ||  || — || September 29, 2005 || Kitt Peak || Spacewatch || — || align=right data-sort-value="0.86" | 860 m || 
|-id=266 bgcolor=#E9E9E9
| 327266 ||  || — || September 29, 2005 || Kitt Peak || Spacewatch || — || align=right data-sort-value="0.99" | 990 m || 
|-id=267 bgcolor=#E9E9E9
| 327267 ||  || — || September 29, 2005 || Anderson Mesa || LONEOS || — || align=right | 2.0 km || 
|-id=268 bgcolor=#E9E9E9
| 327268 ||  || — || September 29, 2005 || Kitt Peak || Spacewatch || — || align=right | 1.4 km || 
|-id=269 bgcolor=#E9E9E9
| 327269 ||  || — || September 29, 2005 || Kitt Peak || Spacewatch || MAR || align=right | 1.2 km || 
|-id=270 bgcolor=#E9E9E9
| 327270 ||  || — || September 30, 2005 || Mount Lemmon || Mount Lemmon Survey || — || align=right data-sort-value="0.87" | 870 m || 
|-id=271 bgcolor=#E9E9E9
| 327271 ||  || — || September 30, 2005 || Palomar || NEAT || — || align=right | 1.3 km || 
|-id=272 bgcolor=#E9E9E9
| 327272 ||  || — || September 30, 2005 || Mount Lemmon || Mount Lemmon Survey || — || align=right | 1.4 km || 
|-id=273 bgcolor=#E9E9E9
| 327273 ||  || — || September 30, 2005 || Mount Lemmon || Mount Lemmon Survey || — || align=right | 1.6 km || 
|-id=274 bgcolor=#E9E9E9
| 327274 ||  || — || September 29, 2005 || Kitt Peak || Spacewatch || — || align=right | 2.3 km || 
|-id=275 bgcolor=#E9E9E9
| 327275 ||  || — || September 30, 2005 || Mount Lemmon || Mount Lemmon Survey || — || align=right | 1.7 km || 
|-id=276 bgcolor=#E9E9E9
| 327276 ||  || — || September 29, 2005 || Kitt Peak || Spacewatch || — || align=right | 1.8 km || 
|-id=277 bgcolor=#E9E9E9
| 327277 ||  || — || September 30, 2005 || Kitt Peak || Spacewatch || — || align=right | 1.7 km || 
|-id=278 bgcolor=#E9E9E9
| 327278 ||  || — || September 22, 2005 || Palomar || NEAT || — || align=right | 2.3 km || 
|-id=279 bgcolor=#E9E9E9
| 327279 ||  || — || September 26, 2005 || Kitt Peak || Spacewatch || — || align=right data-sort-value="0.86" | 860 m || 
|-id=280 bgcolor=#E9E9E9
| 327280 ||  || — || September 24, 2005 || Palomar || NEAT || — || align=right | 1.9 km || 
|-id=281 bgcolor=#E9E9E9
| 327281 ||  || — || September 26, 2005 || Kitt Peak || Spacewatch || MAR || align=right | 1.1 km || 
|-id=282 bgcolor=#E9E9E9
| 327282 ||  || — || October 1, 2005 || Catalina || CSS || — || align=right | 2.0 km || 
|-id=283 bgcolor=#FA8072
| 327283 ||  || — || October 3, 2005 || Kitt Peak || Spacewatch || H || align=right data-sort-value="0.62" | 620 m || 
|-id=284 bgcolor=#E9E9E9
| 327284 ||  || — || October 1, 2005 || Kitt Peak || Spacewatch || — || align=right | 2.3 km || 
|-id=285 bgcolor=#E9E9E9
| 327285 ||  || — || October 4, 2005 || Palomar || NEAT || — || align=right | 1.9 km || 
|-id=286 bgcolor=#fefefe
| 327286 ||  || — || October 1, 2005 || Pla D'Arguines || R. Ferrando || H || align=right data-sort-value="0.86" | 860 m || 
|-id=287 bgcolor=#E9E9E9
| 327287 ||  || — || October 5, 2005 || Kitt Peak || Spacewatch || — || align=right | 1.6 km || 
|-id=288 bgcolor=#E9E9E9
| 327288 ||  || — || October 6, 2005 || Catalina || CSS || — || align=right | 2.8 km || 
|-id=289 bgcolor=#E9E9E9
| 327289 ||  || — || October 6, 2005 || Catalina || CSS || — || align=right | 3.6 km || 
|-id=290 bgcolor=#E9E9E9
| 327290 ||  || — || October 6, 2005 || Mount Lemmon || Mount Lemmon Survey || — || align=right | 2.7 km || 
|-id=291 bgcolor=#E9E9E9
| 327291 ||  || — || October 7, 2005 || Anderson Mesa || LONEOS || — || align=right | 3.0 km || 
|-id=292 bgcolor=#E9E9E9
| 327292 ||  || — || October 8, 2005 || Socorro || LINEAR || — || align=right | 1.9 km || 
|-id=293 bgcolor=#E9E9E9
| 327293 ||  || — || October 7, 2005 || Kitt Peak || Spacewatch || — || align=right | 1.1 km || 
|-id=294 bgcolor=#E9E9E9
| 327294 ||  || — || October 7, 2005 || Kitt Peak || Spacewatch || — || align=right | 1.6 km || 
|-id=295 bgcolor=#E9E9E9
| 327295 ||  || — || October 7, 2005 || Kitt Peak || Spacewatch || — || align=right | 1.4 km || 
|-id=296 bgcolor=#E9E9E9
| 327296 ||  || — || October 7, 2005 || Kitt Peak || Spacewatch || — || align=right | 1.3 km || 
|-id=297 bgcolor=#E9E9E9
| 327297 ||  || — || October 7, 2005 || Kitt Peak || Spacewatch || — || align=right | 1.4 km || 
|-id=298 bgcolor=#E9E9E9
| 327298 ||  || — || September 29, 2005 || Kitt Peak || Spacewatch || — || align=right | 1.8 km || 
|-id=299 bgcolor=#E9E9E9
| 327299 ||  || — || October 8, 2005 || Kitt Peak || Spacewatch || — || align=right | 1.4 km || 
|-id=300 bgcolor=#E9E9E9
| 327300 ||  || — || October 8, 2005 || Kitt Peak || Spacewatch || — || align=right | 2.0 km || 
|}

327301–327400 

|-bgcolor=#E9E9E9
| 327301 ||  || — || October 8, 2005 || Kitt Peak || Spacewatch || — || align=right | 2.2 km || 
|-id=302 bgcolor=#E9E9E9
| 327302 ||  || — || September 29, 2005 || Kitt Peak || Spacewatch || — || align=right | 2.1 km || 
|-id=303 bgcolor=#E9E9E9
| 327303 ||  || — || October 9, 2005 || Kitt Peak || Spacewatch || — || align=right | 1.6 km || 
|-id=304 bgcolor=#E9E9E9
| 327304 ||  || — || October 9, 2005 || Kitt Peak || Spacewatch || HEN || align=right | 1.0 km || 
|-id=305 bgcolor=#E9E9E9
| 327305 ||  || — || October 1, 2005 || Catalina || CSS || — || align=right | 1.5 km || 
|-id=306 bgcolor=#E9E9E9
| 327306 ||  || — || October 11, 2005 || Apache Point || A. C. Becker || — || align=right | 1.8 km || 
|-id=307 bgcolor=#fefefe
| 327307 ||  || — || October 28, 2005 || Socorro || LINEAR || H || align=right data-sort-value="0.68" | 680 m || 
|-id=308 bgcolor=#E9E9E9
| 327308 ||  || — || October 21, 2005 || Palomar || NEAT || EUN || align=right | 1.4 km || 
|-id=309 bgcolor=#E9E9E9
| 327309 ||  || — || October 22, 2005 || Kitt Peak || Spacewatch || — || align=right | 1.4 km || 
|-id=310 bgcolor=#E9E9E9
| 327310 ||  || — || October 22, 2005 || Kitt Peak || Spacewatch || — || align=right | 1.6 km || 
|-id=311 bgcolor=#E9E9E9
| 327311 ||  || — || October 22, 2005 || Kitt Peak || Spacewatch || — || align=right | 1.2 km || 
|-id=312 bgcolor=#E9E9E9
| 327312 ||  || — || October 22, 2005 || Catalina || CSS || — || align=right | 1.6 km || 
|-id=313 bgcolor=#E9E9E9
| 327313 ||  || — || October 23, 2005 || Kitt Peak || Spacewatch || — || align=right | 1.7 km || 
|-id=314 bgcolor=#E9E9E9
| 327314 ||  || — || October 23, 2005 || Catalina || CSS || — || align=right | 1.8 km || 
|-id=315 bgcolor=#E9E9E9
| 327315 ||  || — || October 23, 2005 || Kitt Peak || Spacewatch || NEM || align=right | 2.1 km || 
|-id=316 bgcolor=#E9E9E9
| 327316 ||  || — || October 24, 2005 || Kitt Peak || Spacewatch || — || align=right data-sort-value="0.71" | 710 m || 
|-id=317 bgcolor=#E9E9E9
| 327317 ||  || — || October 24, 2005 || Kitt Peak || Spacewatch || — || align=right | 2.3 km || 
|-id=318 bgcolor=#E9E9E9
| 327318 ||  || — || October 24, 2005 || Kitt Peak || Spacewatch || — || align=right | 2.3 km || 
|-id=319 bgcolor=#E9E9E9
| 327319 ||  || — || October 22, 2005 || Kitt Peak || Spacewatch || — || align=right | 2.3 km || 
|-id=320 bgcolor=#E9E9E9
| 327320 ||  || — || October 22, 2005 || Kitt Peak || Spacewatch || — || align=right | 2.4 km || 
|-id=321 bgcolor=#E9E9E9
| 327321 ||  || — || October 22, 2005 || Kitt Peak || Spacewatch || — || align=right | 3.3 km || 
|-id=322 bgcolor=#E9E9E9
| 327322 ||  || — || October 23, 2005 || Catalina || CSS || — || align=right | 1.7 km || 
|-id=323 bgcolor=#E9E9E9
| 327323 ||  || — || September 29, 2005 || Mount Lemmon || Mount Lemmon Survey || — || align=right | 1.2 km || 
|-id=324 bgcolor=#E9E9E9
| 327324 ||  || — || October 26, 2005 || Anderson Mesa || LONEOS || — || align=right | 2.3 km || 
|-id=325 bgcolor=#E9E9E9
| 327325 ||  || — || October 22, 2005 || Kitt Peak || Spacewatch || — || align=right | 1.7 km || 
|-id=326 bgcolor=#E9E9E9
| 327326 ||  || — || October 22, 2005 || Kitt Peak || Spacewatch || WIT || align=right | 1.0 km || 
|-id=327 bgcolor=#E9E9E9
| 327327 ||  || — || October 22, 2005 || Kitt Peak || Spacewatch || — || align=right | 1.5 km || 
|-id=328 bgcolor=#E9E9E9
| 327328 ||  || — || October 22, 2005 || Kitt Peak || Spacewatch || — || align=right | 1.5 km || 
|-id=329 bgcolor=#E9E9E9
| 327329 ||  || — || October 22, 2005 || Kitt Peak || Spacewatch || — || align=right | 3.2 km || 
|-id=330 bgcolor=#E9E9E9
| 327330 ||  || — || October 22, 2005 || Kitt Peak || Spacewatch || — || align=right | 2.2 km || 
|-id=331 bgcolor=#E9E9E9
| 327331 ||  || — || October 24, 2005 || Kitt Peak || Spacewatch || MRX || align=right | 1.2 km || 
|-id=332 bgcolor=#E9E9E9
| 327332 ||  || — || October 24, 2005 || Kitt Peak || Spacewatch || — || align=right | 1.7 km || 
|-id=333 bgcolor=#E9E9E9
| 327333 ||  || — || October 24, 2005 || Kitt Peak || Spacewatch || — || align=right data-sort-value="0.99" | 990 m || 
|-id=334 bgcolor=#E9E9E9
| 327334 ||  || — || October 25, 2005 || Kitt Peak || Spacewatch || — || align=right | 1.4 km || 
|-id=335 bgcolor=#E9E9E9
| 327335 ||  || — || October 25, 2005 || Catalina || CSS || — || align=right | 3.1 km || 
|-id=336 bgcolor=#E9E9E9
| 327336 ||  || — || October 25, 2005 || Catalina || CSS || — || align=right | 1.2 km || 
|-id=337 bgcolor=#E9E9E9
| 327337 ||  || — || October 26, 2005 || Kitt Peak || Spacewatch || — || align=right | 1.3 km || 
|-id=338 bgcolor=#E9E9E9
| 327338 ||  || — || October 22, 2005 || Catalina || CSS || — || align=right | 3.5 km || 
|-id=339 bgcolor=#E9E9E9
| 327339 ||  || — || September 30, 2005 || Mount Lemmon || Mount Lemmon Survey || — || align=right | 1.5 km || 
|-id=340 bgcolor=#E9E9E9
| 327340 ||  || — || October 24, 2005 || Kitt Peak || Spacewatch || — || align=right data-sort-value="0.96" | 960 m || 
|-id=341 bgcolor=#E9E9E9
| 327341 ||  || — || October 24, 2005 || Kitt Peak || Spacewatch || HEN || align=right | 1.2 km || 
|-id=342 bgcolor=#E9E9E9
| 327342 ||  || — || October 24, 2005 || Kitt Peak || Spacewatch || — || align=right | 2.9 km || 
|-id=343 bgcolor=#E9E9E9
| 327343 ||  || — || October 25, 2005 || Mount Lemmon || Mount Lemmon Survey || — || align=right | 1.5 km || 
|-id=344 bgcolor=#E9E9E9
| 327344 ||  || — || October 25, 2005 || Mount Lemmon || Mount Lemmon Survey || — || align=right | 1.6 km || 
|-id=345 bgcolor=#E9E9E9
| 327345 ||  || — || October 27, 2005 || Mount Lemmon || Mount Lemmon Survey || NEM || align=right | 2.5 km || 
|-id=346 bgcolor=#E9E9E9
| 327346 ||  || — || October 27, 2005 || Mount Lemmon || Mount Lemmon Survey || — || align=right | 2.0 km || 
|-id=347 bgcolor=#E9E9E9
| 327347 ||  || — || October 22, 2005 || Kitt Peak || Spacewatch || HOF || align=right | 2.8 km || 
|-id=348 bgcolor=#E9E9E9
| 327348 ||  || — || October 25, 2005 || Kitt Peak || Spacewatch || — || align=right | 1.6 km || 
|-id=349 bgcolor=#E9E9E9
| 327349 ||  || — || October 1, 2005 || Mount Lemmon || Mount Lemmon Survey || HEN || align=right | 1.2 km || 
|-id=350 bgcolor=#E9E9E9
| 327350 ||  || — || October 26, 2005 || Anderson Mesa || LONEOS || EUN || align=right | 1.8 km || 
|-id=351 bgcolor=#E9E9E9
| 327351 ||  || — || October 25, 2005 || Kitt Peak || Spacewatch || — || align=right data-sort-value="0.83" | 830 m || 
|-id=352 bgcolor=#E9E9E9
| 327352 ||  || — || October 25, 2005 || Kitt Peak || Spacewatch || HEN || align=right | 1.2 km || 
|-id=353 bgcolor=#E9E9E9
| 327353 ||  || — || October 25, 2005 || Kitt Peak || Spacewatch || — || align=right | 1.5 km || 
|-id=354 bgcolor=#E9E9E9
| 327354 ||  || — || October 25, 2005 || Mount Lemmon || Mount Lemmon Survey || — || align=right | 2.4 km || 
|-id=355 bgcolor=#E9E9E9
| 327355 ||  || — || October 25, 2005 || Kitt Peak || Spacewatch || HOF || align=right | 2.7 km || 
|-id=356 bgcolor=#E9E9E9
| 327356 ||  || — || October 25, 2005 || Kitt Peak || Spacewatch || — || align=right | 2.3 km || 
|-id=357 bgcolor=#E9E9E9
| 327357 ||  || — || October 25, 2005 || Kitt Peak || Spacewatch || — || align=right | 2.2 km || 
|-id=358 bgcolor=#E9E9E9
| 327358 ||  || — || October 25, 2005 || Kitt Peak || Spacewatch || — || align=right | 3.1 km || 
|-id=359 bgcolor=#E9E9E9
| 327359 ||  || — || October 25, 2005 || Kitt Peak || Spacewatch || WIT || align=right | 1.2 km || 
|-id=360 bgcolor=#E9E9E9
| 327360 ||  || — || October 25, 2005 || Kitt Peak || Spacewatch || — || align=right | 4.3 km || 
|-id=361 bgcolor=#E9E9E9
| 327361 ||  || — || October 22, 2005 || Catalina || CSS || GEF || align=right | 1.5 km || 
|-id=362 bgcolor=#E9E9E9
| 327362 ||  || — || September 25, 2005 || Kitt Peak || Spacewatch || HEN || align=right | 1.2 km || 
|-id=363 bgcolor=#E9E9E9
| 327363 ||  || — || October 25, 2005 || Kitt Peak || Spacewatch || — || align=right | 1.2 km || 
|-id=364 bgcolor=#d6d6d6
| 327364 ||  || — || October 22, 2005 || Kitt Peak || Spacewatch || — || align=right | 2.8 km || 
|-id=365 bgcolor=#E9E9E9
| 327365 ||  || — || October 1, 2005 || Mount Lemmon || Mount Lemmon Survey || NEM || align=right | 2.7 km || 
|-id=366 bgcolor=#E9E9E9
| 327366 ||  || — || October 24, 2005 || Kitt Peak || Spacewatch || — || align=right | 1.1 km || 
|-id=367 bgcolor=#E9E9E9
| 327367 ||  || — || October 26, 2005 || Kitt Peak || Spacewatch || — || align=right | 1.5 km || 
|-id=368 bgcolor=#E9E9E9
| 327368 ||  || — || October 26, 2005 || Kitt Peak || Spacewatch || — || align=right | 2.1 km || 
|-id=369 bgcolor=#E9E9E9
| 327369 ||  || — || October 26, 2005 || Kitt Peak || Spacewatch || PAD || align=right | 1.6 km || 
|-id=370 bgcolor=#E9E9E9
| 327370 ||  || — || October 26, 2005 || Kitt Peak || Spacewatch || — || align=right | 1.8 km || 
|-id=371 bgcolor=#E9E9E9
| 327371 ||  || — || October 28, 2005 || Mount Lemmon || Mount Lemmon Survey || — || align=right | 1.9 km || 
|-id=372 bgcolor=#E9E9E9
| 327372 ||  || — || October 29, 2005 || Mount Lemmon || Mount Lemmon Survey || — || align=right | 1.8 km || 
|-id=373 bgcolor=#E9E9E9
| 327373 ||  || — || October 27, 2005 || Mount Lemmon || Mount Lemmon Survey || MAR || align=right | 1.4 km || 
|-id=374 bgcolor=#E9E9E9
| 327374 ||  || — || October 28, 2005 || Kitt Peak || Spacewatch || — || align=right | 1.4 km || 
|-id=375 bgcolor=#E9E9E9
| 327375 ||  || — || October 29, 2005 || Mount Lemmon || Mount Lemmon Survey || — || align=right | 1.4 km || 
|-id=376 bgcolor=#E9E9E9
| 327376 ||  || — || October 28, 2005 || Mount Lemmon || Mount Lemmon Survey || — || align=right | 2.9 km || 
|-id=377 bgcolor=#E9E9E9
| 327377 ||  || — || October 29, 2005 || Kitt Peak || Spacewatch || AGN || align=right | 1.3 km || 
|-id=378 bgcolor=#E9E9E9
| 327378 ||  || — || October 29, 2005 || Mount Lemmon || Mount Lemmon Survey || — || align=right | 2.5 km || 
|-id=379 bgcolor=#E9E9E9
| 327379 ||  || — || October 31, 2005 || Catalina || CSS || EUN || align=right | 1.7 km || 
|-id=380 bgcolor=#fefefe
| 327380 ||  || — || October 25, 2005 || Catalina || CSS || H || align=right data-sort-value="0.59" | 590 m || 
|-id=381 bgcolor=#E9E9E9
| 327381 ||  || — || September 30, 2005 || Mount Lemmon || Mount Lemmon Survey || KON || align=right | 2.5 km || 
|-id=382 bgcolor=#E9E9E9
| 327382 ||  || — || October 27, 2005 || Kitt Peak || Spacewatch || WIT || align=right | 1.3 km || 
|-id=383 bgcolor=#E9E9E9
| 327383 ||  || — || October 29, 2005 || Kitt Peak || Spacewatch || — || align=right | 1.2 km || 
|-id=384 bgcolor=#E9E9E9
| 327384 ||  || — || October 29, 2005 || Kitt Peak || Spacewatch || AST || align=right | 1.5 km || 
|-id=385 bgcolor=#E9E9E9
| 327385 ||  || — || October 30, 2005 || Mount Lemmon || Mount Lemmon Survey || WIT || align=right data-sort-value="0.94" | 940 m || 
|-id=386 bgcolor=#E9E9E9
| 327386 ||  || — || October 29, 2005 || Mount Lemmon || Mount Lemmon Survey || — || align=right | 2.9 km || 
|-id=387 bgcolor=#E9E9E9
| 327387 ||  || — || October 31, 2005 || Mount Lemmon || Mount Lemmon Survey || MAR || align=right | 1.7 km || 
|-id=388 bgcolor=#E9E9E9
| 327388 ||  || — || October 25, 2005 || Kitt Peak || Spacewatch || — || align=right | 1.7 km || 
|-id=389 bgcolor=#E9E9E9
| 327389 ||  || — || October 28, 2005 || Kitt Peak || Spacewatch || HEN || align=right | 1.2 km || 
|-id=390 bgcolor=#E9E9E9
| 327390 ||  || — || October 28, 2005 || Catalina || CSS || KON || align=right | 3.1 km || 
|-id=391 bgcolor=#E9E9E9
| 327391 ||  || — || October 29, 2005 || Catalina || CSS || — || align=right | 1.9 km || 
|-id=392 bgcolor=#E9E9E9
| 327392 ||  || — || October 28, 2005 || Mount Lemmon || Mount Lemmon Survey || — || align=right | 3.4 km || 
|-id=393 bgcolor=#E9E9E9
| 327393 ||  || — || October 30, 2005 || Kitt Peak || Spacewatch || PAD || align=right | 1.7 km || 
|-id=394 bgcolor=#E9E9E9
| 327394 ||  || — || October 30, 2005 || Kitt Peak || Spacewatch || — || align=right | 2.8 km || 
|-id=395 bgcolor=#E9E9E9
| 327395 ||  || — || October 27, 2005 || Kitt Peak || Spacewatch || — || align=right | 2.9 km || 
|-id=396 bgcolor=#E9E9E9
| 327396 ||  || — || October 23, 2005 || Catalina || CSS || — || align=right | 3.1 km || 
|-id=397 bgcolor=#E9E9E9
| 327397 ||  || — || October 25, 2005 || Catalina || CSS || INO || align=right | 1.3 km || 
|-id=398 bgcolor=#d6d6d6
| 327398 ||  || — || October 24, 2005 || Mauna Kea || D. J. Tholen || — || align=right | 3.5 km || 
|-id=399 bgcolor=#E9E9E9
| 327399 ||  || — || October 30, 2005 || Kitt Peak || Spacewatch || — || align=right | 1.2 km || 
|-id=400 bgcolor=#E9E9E9
| 327400 ||  || — || October 26, 2005 || Apache Point || A. C. Becker || NEM || align=right | 2.3 km || 
|}

327401–327500 

|-bgcolor=#fefefe
| 327401 || 2005 VU || — || November 1, 2005 || La Silla || R. Behrend || KLI || align=right | 2.0 km || 
|-id=402 bgcolor=#fefefe
| 327402 ||  || — || November 5, 2005 || Socorro || LINEAR || H || align=right data-sort-value="0.87" | 870 m || 
|-id=403 bgcolor=#E9E9E9
| 327403 ||  || — || November 3, 2005 || Kitt Peak || Spacewatch || — || align=right | 2.3 km || 
|-id=404 bgcolor=#E9E9E9
| 327404 ||  || — || November 1, 2005 || Kitt Peak || Spacewatch || — || align=right data-sort-value="0.87" | 870 m || 
|-id=405 bgcolor=#E9E9E9
| 327405 ||  || — || November 4, 2005 || Kitt Peak || Spacewatch || MAR || align=right | 2.2 km || 
|-id=406 bgcolor=#E9E9E9
| 327406 ||  || — || November 4, 2005 || Kitt Peak || Spacewatch || AGN || align=right | 1.7 km || 
|-id=407 bgcolor=#E9E9E9
| 327407 ||  || — || November 3, 2005 || Catalina || CSS || — || align=right | 2.4 km || 
|-id=408 bgcolor=#E9E9E9
| 327408 ||  || — || November 4, 2005 || Socorro || LINEAR || — || align=right | 3.0 km || 
|-id=409 bgcolor=#E9E9E9
| 327409 ||  || — || November 3, 2005 || Catalina || CSS || EUN || align=right | 1.5 km || 
|-id=410 bgcolor=#E9E9E9
| 327410 ||  || — || November 5, 2005 || Kitt Peak || Spacewatch || — || align=right | 1.3 km || 
|-id=411 bgcolor=#E9E9E9
| 327411 ||  || — || November 1, 2005 || Socorro || LINEAR || — || align=right | 2.4 km || 
|-id=412 bgcolor=#E9E9E9
| 327412 ||  || — || November 6, 2005 || Kitt Peak || Spacewatch || NEM || align=right | 2.4 km || 
|-id=413 bgcolor=#E9E9E9
| 327413 ||  || — || November 6, 2005 || Mount Lemmon || Mount Lemmon Survey || — || align=right | 1.4 km || 
|-id=414 bgcolor=#E9E9E9
| 327414 ||  || — || November 2, 2005 || Mount Lemmon || Mount Lemmon Survey || — || align=right | 2.6 km || 
|-id=415 bgcolor=#E9E9E9
| 327415 ||  || — || November 5, 2005 || Kitt Peak || Spacewatch || AGN || align=right | 1.2 km || 
|-id=416 bgcolor=#E9E9E9
| 327416 ||  || — || November 6, 2005 || Mount Lemmon || Mount Lemmon Survey || — || align=right | 2.4 km || 
|-id=417 bgcolor=#E9E9E9
| 327417 ||  || — || November 8, 2005 || Wildberg || R. Apitzsch || — || align=right | 2.2 km || 
|-id=418 bgcolor=#FA8072
| 327418 ||  || — || November 14, 2005 || Palomar || NEAT || H || align=right data-sort-value="0.86" | 860 m || 
|-id=419 bgcolor=#E9E9E9
| 327419 ||  || — || November 1, 2005 || Apache Point || A. C. Becker || — || align=right | 1.2 km || 
|-id=420 bgcolor=#E9E9E9
| 327420 ||  || — || November 12, 2005 || Kitt Peak || Spacewatch || — || align=right | 2.1 km || 
|-id=421 bgcolor=#E9E9E9
| 327421 Yanamandra ||  ||  || November 20, 2005 || Wrightwood || J. W. Young || — || align=right | 2.6 km || 
|-id=422 bgcolor=#E9E9E9
| 327422 ||  || — || November 22, 2005 || Kitt Peak || Spacewatch || — || align=right | 2.8 km || 
|-id=423 bgcolor=#E9E9E9
| 327423 ||  || — || November 21, 2005 || Kitt Peak || Spacewatch || — || align=right | 1.5 km || 
|-id=424 bgcolor=#E9E9E9
| 327424 ||  || — || November 21, 2005 || Kitt Peak || Spacewatch || — || align=right | 1.5 km || 
|-id=425 bgcolor=#E9E9E9
| 327425 ||  || — || November 21, 2005 || Kitt Peak || Spacewatch || WIT || align=right | 1.3 km || 
|-id=426 bgcolor=#E9E9E9
| 327426 ||  || — || November 22, 2005 || Kitt Peak || Spacewatch || — || align=right | 2.2 km || 
|-id=427 bgcolor=#E9E9E9
| 327427 ||  || — || November 22, 2005 || Kitt Peak || Spacewatch || AGN || align=right | 1.5 km || 
|-id=428 bgcolor=#E9E9E9
| 327428 ||  || — || November 22, 2005 || Kitt Peak || Spacewatch || — || align=right | 2.6 km || 
|-id=429 bgcolor=#E9E9E9
| 327429 ||  || — || November 25, 2005 || Mount Lemmon || Mount Lemmon Survey || AEO || align=right | 1.5 km || 
|-id=430 bgcolor=#E9E9E9
| 327430 ||  || — || November 28, 2005 || Junk Bond || D. Healy || WIT || align=right | 1.2 km || 
|-id=431 bgcolor=#E9E9E9
| 327431 ||  || — || November 26, 2005 || Kitt Peak || Spacewatch || HOF || align=right | 2.8 km || 
|-id=432 bgcolor=#E9E9E9
| 327432 ||  || — || November 25, 2005 || Kitt Peak || Spacewatch || — || align=right | 2.2 km || 
|-id=433 bgcolor=#E9E9E9
| 327433 ||  || — || November 25, 2005 || Kitt Peak || Spacewatch || AGN || align=right | 1.3 km || 
|-id=434 bgcolor=#E9E9E9
| 327434 ||  || — || November 26, 2005 || Mount Lemmon || Mount Lemmon Survey || HOF || align=right | 2.7 km || 
|-id=435 bgcolor=#E9E9E9
| 327435 ||  || — || November 26, 2005 || Kitt Peak || Spacewatch || — || align=right | 3.6 km || 
|-id=436 bgcolor=#E9E9E9
| 327436 ||  || — || November 26, 2005 || Kitt Peak || Spacewatch || — || align=right | 1.2 km || 
|-id=437 bgcolor=#d6d6d6
| 327437 ||  || — || November 26, 2005 || Kitt Peak || Spacewatch || BRA || align=right | 2.0 km || 
|-id=438 bgcolor=#E9E9E9
| 327438 ||  || — || November 28, 2005 || Mount Lemmon || Mount Lemmon Survey || — || align=right | 1.2 km || 
|-id=439 bgcolor=#E9E9E9
| 327439 ||  || — || November 25, 2005 || Catalina || CSS || — || align=right | 3.4 km || 
|-id=440 bgcolor=#E9E9E9
| 327440 ||  || — || November 1, 2005 || Mount Lemmon || Mount Lemmon Survey || AGN || align=right | 1.8 km || 
|-id=441 bgcolor=#E9E9E9
| 327441 ||  || — || November 28, 2005 || Catalina || CSS || — || align=right | 2.9 km || 
|-id=442 bgcolor=#E9E9E9
| 327442 ||  || — || November 29, 2005 || Catalina || CSS || JUN || align=right | 1.5 km || 
|-id=443 bgcolor=#E9E9E9
| 327443 ||  || — || November 30, 2005 || Kitt Peak || Spacewatch || — || align=right | 3.2 km || 
|-id=444 bgcolor=#fefefe
| 327444 ||  || — || November 30, 2005 || Socorro || LINEAR || H || align=right | 1.1 km || 
|-id=445 bgcolor=#E9E9E9
| 327445 ||  || — || November 30, 2005 || Socorro || LINEAR || — || align=right | 2.3 km || 
|-id=446 bgcolor=#E9E9E9
| 327446 ||  || — || November 25, 2005 || Mount Lemmon || Mount Lemmon Survey || critical || align=right | 1.3 km || 
|-id=447 bgcolor=#E9E9E9
| 327447 ||  || — || November 25, 2005 || Catalina || CSS || ADE || align=right | 2.8 km || 
|-id=448 bgcolor=#E9E9E9
| 327448 ||  || — || November 25, 2005 || Mount Lemmon || Mount Lemmon Survey || — || align=right | 1.3 km || 
|-id=449 bgcolor=#E9E9E9
| 327449 ||  || — || November 25, 2005 || Mount Lemmon || Mount Lemmon Survey || — || align=right data-sort-value="0.98" | 980 m || 
|-id=450 bgcolor=#E9E9E9
| 327450 ||  || — || November 26, 2005 || Mount Lemmon || Mount Lemmon Survey || — || align=right | 1.0 km || 
|-id=451 bgcolor=#E9E9E9
| 327451 ||  || — || November 28, 2005 || Kitt Peak || Spacewatch || — || align=right | 2.2 km || 
|-id=452 bgcolor=#E9E9E9
| 327452 ||  || — || October 31, 2005 || Catalina || CSS || WIT || align=right | 1.5 km || 
|-id=453 bgcolor=#E9E9E9
| 327453 ||  || — || November 28, 2005 || Mount Lemmon || Mount Lemmon Survey || — || align=right | 1.0 km || 
|-id=454 bgcolor=#E9E9E9
| 327454 ||  || — || November 29, 2005 || Mount Lemmon || Mount Lemmon Survey || — || align=right | 2.7 km || 
|-id=455 bgcolor=#E9E9E9
| 327455 ||  || — || November 29, 2005 || Mount Lemmon || Mount Lemmon Survey || — || align=right | 3.6 km || 
|-id=456 bgcolor=#E9E9E9
| 327456 ||  || — || November 29, 2005 || Mount Lemmon || Mount Lemmon Survey || — || align=right | 2.3 km || 
|-id=457 bgcolor=#E9E9E9
| 327457 ||  || — || November 30, 2005 || Kitt Peak || Spacewatch || — || align=right | 1.1 km || 
|-id=458 bgcolor=#d6d6d6
| 327458 ||  || — || November 30, 2005 || Kitt Peak || Spacewatch || — || align=right | 3.4 km || 
|-id=459 bgcolor=#E9E9E9
| 327459 ||  || — || November 21, 2005 || Anderson Mesa || LONEOS || — || align=right | 2.8 km || 
|-id=460 bgcolor=#d6d6d6
| 327460 ||  || — || October 1, 2005 || Mount Lemmon || Mount Lemmon Survey || — || align=right | 3.0 km || 
|-id=461 bgcolor=#E9E9E9
| 327461 ||  || — || December 4, 2005 || Kitt Peak || Spacewatch || — || align=right | 2.4 km || 
|-id=462 bgcolor=#d6d6d6
| 327462 ||  || — || December 6, 2005 || Socorro || LINEAR || — || align=right | 3.1 km || 
|-id=463 bgcolor=#E9E9E9
| 327463 ||  || — || December 6, 2005 || Kitt Peak || Spacewatch || — || align=right | 2.1 km || 
|-id=464 bgcolor=#E9E9E9
| 327464 ||  || — || December 7, 2005 || Kitt Peak || Spacewatch || — || align=right | 2.8 km || 
|-id=465 bgcolor=#E9E9E9
| 327465 ||  || — || November 1, 2005 || Kitt Peak || Spacewatch || PAD || align=right | 1.5 km || 
|-id=466 bgcolor=#fefefe
| 327466 ||  || — || December 7, 2005 || Socorro || LINEAR || H || align=right data-sort-value="0.95" | 950 m || 
|-id=467 bgcolor=#d6d6d6
| 327467 ||  || — || December 1, 2005 || Kitt Peak || M. W. Buie || — || align=right | 3.2 km || 
|-id=468 bgcolor=#d6d6d6
| 327468 ||  || — || December 1, 2005 || Kitt Peak || M. W. Buie || — || align=right | 3.6 km || 
|-id=469 bgcolor=#d6d6d6
| 327469 ||  || — || December 1, 2005 || Kitt Peak || M. W. Buie || — || align=right | 2.9 km || 
|-id=470 bgcolor=#E9E9E9
| 327470 ||  || — || December 2, 2005 || Mount Lemmon || Mount Lemmon Survey || WIT || align=right | 1.1 km || 
|-id=471 bgcolor=#E9E9E9
| 327471 ||  || — || December 21, 2005 || Kitt Peak || Spacewatch || — || align=right | 1.3 km || 
|-id=472 bgcolor=#E9E9E9
| 327472 ||  || — || December 23, 2005 || Palomar || NEAT || — || align=right | 2.5 km || 
|-id=473 bgcolor=#d6d6d6
| 327473 ||  || — || November 3, 2005 || Mount Lemmon || Mount Lemmon Survey || — || align=right | 2.7 km || 
|-id=474 bgcolor=#E9E9E9
| 327474 ||  || — || December 23, 2005 || Kitt Peak || Spacewatch || — || align=right | 1.7 km || 
|-id=475 bgcolor=#d6d6d6
| 327475 ||  || — || October 29, 2005 || Mount Lemmon || Mount Lemmon Survey || — || align=right | 3.2 km || 
|-id=476 bgcolor=#E9E9E9
| 327476 ||  || — || July 14, 2004 || Siding Spring || SSS || — || align=right | 2.7 km || 
|-id=477 bgcolor=#d6d6d6
| 327477 ||  || — || December 24, 2005 || Kitt Peak || Spacewatch || — || align=right | 3.0 km || 
|-id=478 bgcolor=#d6d6d6
| 327478 ||  || — || December 24, 2005 || Kitt Peak || Spacewatch || — || align=right | 3.0 km || 
|-id=479 bgcolor=#d6d6d6
| 327479 ||  || — || December 25, 2005 || Mount Lemmon || Mount Lemmon Survey || KOR || align=right | 1.7 km || 
|-id=480 bgcolor=#E9E9E9
| 327480 ||  || — || December 24, 2005 || Kitt Peak || Spacewatch || — || align=right | 2.9 km || 
|-id=481 bgcolor=#d6d6d6
| 327481 ||  || — || December 24, 2005 || Kitt Peak || Spacewatch || — || align=right | 3.5 km || 
|-id=482 bgcolor=#d6d6d6
| 327482 ||  || — || December 24, 2005 || Kitt Peak || Spacewatch || CHA || align=right | 2.0 km || 
|-id=483 bgcolor=#d6d6d6
| 327483 ||  || — || December 25, 2005 || Mount Lemmon || Mount Lemmon Survey || — || align=right | 3.4 km || 
|-id=484 bgcolor=#d6d6d6
| 327484 ||  || — || December 25, 2005 || Mount Lemmon || Mount Lemmon Survey || KOR || align=right | 1.5 km || 
|-id=485 bgcolor=#d6d6d6
| 327485 ||  || — || December 25, 2005 || Kitt Peak || Spacewatch || — || align=right | 2.2 km || 
|-id=486 bgcolor=#d6d6d6
| 327486 ||  || — || December 28, 2005 || Mount Lemmon || Mount Lemmon Survey || KAR || align=right | 1.1 km || 
|-id=487 bgcolor=#d6d6d6
| 327487 ||  || — || December 28, 2005 || Mount Lemmon || Mount Lemmon Survey || TEL || align=right | 1.5 km || 
|-id=488 bgcolor=#d6d6d6
| 327488 ||  || — || December 29, 2005 || Mount Lemmon || Mount Lemmon Survey || K-2 || align=right | 1.7 km || 
|-id=489 bgcolor=#E9E9E9
| 327489 ||  || — || December 26, 2005 || Mount Lemmon || Mount Lemmon Survey || — || align=right | 3.4 km || 
|-id=490 bgcolor=#fefefe
| 327490 ||  || — || December 23, 2005 || Palomar || NEAT || H || align=right data-sort-value="0.64" | 640 m || 
|-id=491 bgcolor=#E9E9E9
| 327491 ||  || — || December 23, 2005 || Palomar || NEAT || — || align=right | 2.4 km || 
|-id=492 bgcolor=#d6d6d6
| 327492 ||  || — || December 29, 2005 || Kitt Peak || Spacewatch || THM || align=right | 2.6 km || 
|-id=493 bgcolor=#d6d6d6
| 327493 ||  || — || December 30, 2005 || Kitt Peak || Spacewatch || — || align=right | 2.8 km || 
|-id=494 bgcolor=#d6d6d6
| 327494 ||  || — || December 25, 2005 || Kitt Peak || Spacewatch || CHA || align=right | 1.9 km || 
|-id=495 bgcolor=#d6d6d6
| 327495 ||  || — || December 22, 2005 || Kitt Peak || Spacewatch || KOR || align=right | 1.8 km || 
|-id=496 bgcolor=#d6d6d6
| 327496 ||  || — || December 30, 2005 || Kitt Peak || Spacewatch || — || align=right | 1.9 km || 
|-id=497 bgcolor=#E9E9E9
| 327497 ||  || — || December 26, 2005 || Mount Lemmon || Mount Lemmon Survey || HOF || align=right | 3.8 km || 
|-id=498 bgcolor=#E9E9E9
| 327498 ||  || — || January 4, 2006 || Mount Lemmon || Mount Lemmon Survey || AGN || align=right | 1.2 km || 
|-id=499 bgcolor=#d6d6d6
| 327499 ||  || — || January 6, 2006 || Socorro || LINEAR || — || align=right | 3.5 km || 
|-id=500 bgcolor=#d6d6d6
| 327500 ||  || — || January 4, 2006 || Kitt Peak || Spacewatch || EOS || align=right | 2.1 km || 
|}

327501–327600 

|-bgcolor=#d6d6d6
| 327501 ||  || — || December 28, 2005 || Kitt Peak || Spacewatch || — || align=right | 3.1 km || 
|-id=502 bgcolor=#d6d6d6
| 327502 ||  || — || January 6, 2006 || Kitt Peak || Spacewatch || — || align=right | 2.8 km || 
|-id=503 bgcolor=#E9E9E9
| 327503 ||  || — || January 6, 2006 || Kitt Peak || Spacewatch || — || align=right | 2.4 km || 
|-id=504 bgcolor=#d6d6d6
| 327504 ||  || — || January 6, 2006 || Kitt Peak || Spacewatch || — || align=right | 3.0 km || 
|-id=505 bgcolor=#d6d6d6
| 327505 ||  || — || January 8, 2006 || Mount Lemmon || Mount Lemmon Survey || — || align=right | 3.2 km || 
|-id=506 bgcolor=#d6d6d6
| 327506 ||  || — || January 6, 2006 || Kitt Peak || Spacewatch || — || align=right | 3.4 km || 
|-id=507 bgcolor=#d6d6d6
| 327507 ||  || — || January 7, 2006 || Mount Lemmon || Mount Lemmon Survey || — || align=right | 3.1 km || 
|-id=508 bgcolor=#d6d6d6
| 327508 ||  || — || January 20, 2006 || Socorro || LINEAR || EUP || align=right | 4.3 km || 
|-id=509 bgcolor=#d6d6d6
| 327509 ||  || — || January 20, 2006 || Kitt Peak || Spacewatch || TIR || align=right | 4.0 km || 
|-id=510 bgcolor=#d6d6d6
| 327510 ||  || — || January 22, 2006 || Mount Lemmon || Mount Lemmon Survey || EOS || align=right | 2.3 km || 
|-id=511 bgcolor=#d6d6d6
| 327511 ||  || — || January 23, 2006 || Mount Lemmon || Mount Lemmon Survey || — || align=right | 3.0 km || 
|-id=512 bgcolor=#d6d6d6
| 327512 Bíró ||  ||  || January 24, 2006 || Piszkéstető || K. Sárneczky || — || align=right | 2.2 km || 
|-id=513 bgcolor=#d6d6d6
| 327513 ||  || — || January 23, 2006 || Mount Lemmon || Mount Lemmon Survey || — || align=right | 2.8 km || 
|-id=514 bgcolor=#d6d6d6
| 327514 ||  || — || January 25, 2006 || Kitt Peak || Spacewatch || TIR || align=right | 3.5 km || 
|-id=515 bgcolor=#d6d6d6
| 327515 ||  || — || January 22, 2006 || Catalina || CSS || BRA || align=right | 2.7 km || 
|-id=516 bgcolor=#d6d6d6
| 327516 ||  || — || January 23, 2006 || Kitt Peak || Spacewatch || KOR || align=right | 1.5 km || 
|-id=517 bgcolor=#d6d6d6
| 327517 ||  || — || January 23, 2006 || Kitt Peak || Spacewatch || — || align=right | 3.0 km || 
|-id=518 bgcolor=#d6d6d6
| 327518 ||  || — || January 23, 2006 || Kitt Peak || Spacewatch || — || align=right | 3.0 km || 
|-id=519 bgcolor=#d6d6d6
| 327519 ||  || — || January 23, 2006 || Kitt Peak || Spacewatch || — || align=right | 3.8 km || 
|-id=520 bgcolor=#d6d6d6
| 327520 ||  || — || January 25, 2006 || Kitt Peak || Spacewatch || — || align=right | 2.4 km || 
|-id=521 bgcolor=#d6d6d6
| 327521 ||  || — || January 26, 2006 || Kitt Peak || Spacewatch || EOS || align=right | 2.3 km || 
|-id=522 bgcolor=#d6d6d6
| 327522 ||  || — || January 26, 2006 || Mount Lemmon || Mount Lemmon Survey || — || align=right | 2.7 km || 
|-id=523 bgcolor=#d6d6d6
| 327523 ||  || — || January 25, 2006 || Kitt Peak || Spacewatch || — || align=right | 2.5 km || 
|-id=524 bgcolor=#d6d6d6
| 327524 ||  || — || January 25, 2006 || Kitt Peak || Spacewatch || — || align=right | 2.7 km || 
|-id=525 bgcolor=#d6d6d6
| 327525 ||  || — || January 25, 2006 || Kitt Peak || Spacewatch || HYG || align=right | 3.0 km || 
|-id=526 bgcolor=#d6d6d6
| 327526 ||  || — || January 25, 2006 || Kitt Peak || Spacewatch || — || align=right | 2.8 km || 
|-id=527 bgcolor=#d6d6d6
| 327527 ||  || — || January 26, 2006 || Kitt Peak || Spacewatch || EOS || align=right | 2.2 km || 
|-id=528 bgcolor=#d6d6d6
| 327528 ||  || — || January 26, 2006 || Kitt Peak || Spacewatch || — || align=right | 3.1 km || 
|-id=529 bgcolor=#d6d6d6
| 327529 ||  || — || January 28, 2006 || Mount Lemmon || Mount Lemmon Survey || — || align=right | 2.6 km || 
|-id=530 bgcolor=#d6d6d6
| 327530 ||  || — || January 28, 2006 || Mount Lemmon || Mount Lemmon Survey || SAN || align=right | 1.7 km || 
|-id=531 bgcolor=#d6d6d6
| 327531 ||  || — || January 26, 2006 || Mount Lemmon || Mount Lemmon Survey || — || align=right | 2.5 km || 
|-id=532 bgcolor=#d6d6d6
| 327532 ||  || — || January 24, 2006 || Socorro || LINEAR || — || align=right | 3.1 km || 
|-id=533 bgcolor=#d6d6d6
| 327533 ||  || — || January 24, 2006 || Anderson Mesa || LONEOS || — || align=right | 4.0 km || 
|-id=534 bgcolor=#d6d6d6
| 327534 ||  || — || January 25, 2006 || Kitt Peak || Spacewatch || KOR || align=right | 1.8 km || 
|-id=535 bgcolor=#d6d6d6
| 327535 ||  || — || January 25, 2006 || Kitt Peak || Spacewatch || KOR || align=right | 1.7 km || 
|-id=536 bgcolor=#d6d6d6
| 327536 ||  || — || January 25, 2006 || Kitt Peak || Spacewatch || — || align=right | 3.3 km || 
|-id=537 bgcolor=#d6d6d6
| 327537 ||  || — || January 25, 2006 || Kitt Peak || Spacewatch || — || align=right | 3.4 km || 
|-id=538 bgcolor=#d6d6d6
| 327538 ||  || — || January 26, 2006 || Mount Lemmon || Mount Lemmon Survey || — || align=right | 2.7 km || 
|-id=539 bgcolor=#d6d6d6
| 327539 ||  || — || January 27, 2006 || Mount Lemmon || Mount Lemmon Survey || — || align=right | 2.8 km || 
|-id=540 bgcolor=#d6d6d6
| 327540 ||  || — || January 27, 2006 || Mount Lemmon || Mount Lemmon Survey || — || align=right | 3.2 km || 
|-id=541 bgcolor=#d6d6d6
| 327541 ||  || — || January 28, 2006 || Mount Lemmon || Mount Lemmon Survey || EUP || align=right | 7.1 km || 
|-id=542 bgcolor=#d6d6d6
| 327542 ||  || — || January 30, 2006 || Kitt Peak || Spacewatch || EOS || align=right | 2.0 km || 
|-id=543 bgcolor=#E9E9E9
| 327543 ||  || — || January 31, 2006 || Mount Lemmon || Mount Lemmon Survey || AGN || align=right | 1.3 km || 
|-id=544 bgcolor=#d6d6d6
| 327544 ||  || — || January 31, 2006 || Kitt Peak || Spacewatch || — || align=right | 3.6 km || 
|-id=545 bgcolor=#d6d6d6
| 327545 ||  || — || January 31, 2006 || Kitt Peak || Spacewatch || — || align=right | 3.3 km || 
|-id=546 bgcolor=#d6d6d6
| 327546 ||  || — || January 23, 2006 || Kitt Peak || Spacewatch || — || align=right | 2.9 km || 
|-id=547 bgcolor=#d6d6d6
| 327547 ||  || — || January 31, 2006 || Kitt Peak || Spacewatch || — || align=right | 2.7 km || 
|-id=548 bgcolor=#d6d6d6
| 327548 ||  || — || January 25, 2006 || Kitt Peak || Spacewatch || — || align=right | 2.7 km || 
|-id=549 bgcolor=#d6d6d6
| 327549 ||  || — || January 23, 2006 || Kitt Peak || Spacewatch || EOS || align=right | 2.3 km || 
|-id=550 bgcolor=#d6d6d6
| 327550 ||  || — || January 31, 2006 || Kitt Peak || Spacewatch || EMA || align=right | 3.5 km || 
|-id=551 bgcolor=#d6d6d6
| 327551 ||  || — || January 23, 2006 || Kitt Peak || Spacewatch || — || align=right | 2.7 km || 
|-id=552 bgcolor=#d6d6d6
| 327552 ||  || — || February 4, 2006 || Wrightwood || J. W. Young || LIX || align=right | 3.4 km || 
|-id=553 bgcolor=#d6d6d6
| 327553 ||  || — || February 1, 2006 || Kitt Peak || Spacewatch || EMA || align=right | 5.5 km || 
|-id=554 bgcolor=#d6d6d6
| 327554 ||  || — || February 1, 2006 || Mount Lemmon || Mount Lemmon Survey || — || align=right | 2.1 km || 
|-id=555 bgcolor=#d6d6d6
| 327555 ||  || — || February 2, 2006 || Kitt Peak || Spacewatch || — || align=right | 4.1 km || 
|-id=556 bgcolor=#d6d6d6
| 327556 ||  || — || February 2, 2006 || Mount Lemmon || Mount Lemmon Survey || VER || align=right | 3.1 km || 
|-id=557 bgcolor=#d6d6d6
| 327557 ||  || — || February 2, 2006 || Kitt Peak || Spacewatch || EMA || align=right | 3.0 km || 
|-id=558 bgcolor=#d6d6d6
| 327558 ||  || — || January 22, 2006 || Mount Lemmon || Mount Lemmon Survey || — || align=right | 2.6 km || 
|-id=559 bgcolor=#E9E9E9
| 327559 ||  || — || February 2, 2006 || Mauna Kea || P. A. Wiegert || DOR || align=right | 2.8 km || 
|-id=560 bgcolor=#d6d6d6
| 327560 || 2006 DB || — || February 20, 2006 || Mayhill || A. Lowe || EOS || align=right | 2.6 km || 
|-id=561 bgcolor=#d6d6d6
| 327561 ||  || — || February 20, 2006 || Kitt Peak || Spacewatch || — || align=right | 4.7 km || 
|-id=562 bgcolor=#d6d6d6
| 327562 ||  || — || February 20, 2006 || Mount Lemmon || Mount Lemmon Survey || — || align=right | 2.8 km || 
|-id=563 bgcolor=#d6d6d6
| 327563 ||  || — || February 20, 2006 || Catalina || CSS || — || align=right | 4.9 km || 
|-id=564 bgcolor=#d6d6d6
| 327564 ||  || — || February 20, 2006 || Catalina || CSS || TIR || align=right | 3.6 km || 
|-id=565 bgcolor=#d6d6d6
| 327565 ||  || — || February 22, 2006 || Catalina || CSS || — || align=right | 3.6 km || 
|-id=566 bgcolor=#d6d6d6
| 327566 ||  || — || January 23, 2006 || Kitt Peak || Spacewatch || — || align=right | 3.9 km || 
|-id=567 bgcolor=#d6d6d6
| 327567 ||  || — || February 20, 2006 || Kitt Peak || Spacewatch || URS || align=right | 3.6 km || 
|-id=568 bgcolor=#d6d6d6
| 327568 ||  || — || January 23, 2006 || Kitt Peak || Spacewatch || KOR || align=right | 2.1 km || 
|-id=569 bgcolor=#d6d6d6
| 327569 ||  || — || February 20, 2006 || Kitt Peak || Spacewatch || — || align=right | 4.7 km || 
|-id=570 bgcolor=#d6d6d6
| 327570 ||  || — || February 21, 2006 || Mount Lemmon || Mount Lemmon Survey || — || align=right | 3.8 km || 
|-id=571 bgcolor=#d6d6d6
| 327571 ||  || — || February 22, 2006 || Catalina || CSS || — || align=right | 3.8 km || 
|-id=572 bgcolor=#d6d6d6
| 327572 ||  || — || February 20, 2006 || Mount Lemmon || Mount Lemmon Survey || — || align=right | 2.6 km || 
|-id=573 bgcolor=#d6d6d6
| 327573 ||  || — || February 20, 2006 || Catalina || CSS || — || align=right | 4.3 km || 
|-id=574 bgcolor=#d6d6d6
| 327574 ||  || — || February 4, 2006 || Kitt Peak || Spacewatch || THM || align=right | 2.3 km || 
|-id=575 bgcolor=#d6d6d6
| 327575 ||  || — || February 25, 2006 || Kitt Peak || Spacewatch || EOS || align=right | 2.6 km || 
|-id=576 bgcolor=#d6d6d6
| 327576 ||  || — || January 28, 2006 || Anderson Mesa || LONEOS || — || align=right | 4.3 km || 
|-id=577 bgcolor=#E9E9E9
| 327577 ||  || — || February 3, 2006 || Mount Lemmon || Mount Lemmon Survey || — || align=right | 4.8 km || 
|-id=578 bgcolor=#d6d6d6
| 327578 ||  || — || February 25, 2006 || Kitt Peak || Spacewatch || — || align=right | 4.5 km || 
|-id=579 bgcolor=#d6d6d6
| 327579 ||  || — || February 25, 2006 || Kitt Peak || Spacewatch || — || align=right | 3.2 km || 
|-id=580 bgcolor=#d6d6d6
| 327580 ||  || — || February 25, 2006 || Kitt Peak || Spacewatch || 637 || align=right | 2.8 km || 
|-id=581 bgcolor=#d6d6d6
| 327581 ||  || — || February 25, 2006 || Kitt Peak || Spacewatch || — || align=right | 3.7 km || 
|-id=582 bgcolor=#d6d6d6
| 327582 ||  || — || January 7, 2000 || Kitt Peak || Spacewatch || HYG || align=right | 3.1 km || 
|-id=583 bgcolor=#d6d6d6
| 327583 ||  || — || January 31, 2006 || Kitt Peak || Spacewatch || MRC || align=right | 2.6 km || 
|-id=584 bgcolor=#d6d6d6
| 327584 ||  || — || February 25, 2006 || Kitt Peak || Spacewatch || — || align=right | 3.4 km || 
|-id=585 bgcolor=#d6d6d6
| 327585 ||  || — || February 25, 2006 || Mount Lemmon || Mount Lemmon Survey || VER || align=right | 2.9 km || 
|-id=586 bgcolor=#d6d6d6
| 327586 ||  || — || February 27, 2006 || Kitt Peak || Spacewatch || — || align=right | 3.6 km || 
|-id=587 bgcolor=#d6d6d6
| 327587 ||  || — || February 27, 2006 || Kitt Peak || Spacewatch || — || align=right | 2.7 km || 
|-id=588 bgcolor=#d6d6d6
| 327588 ||  || — || February 27, 2006 || Kitt Peak || Spacewatch || EOS || align=right | 2.6 km || 
|-id=589 bgcolor=#d6d6d6
| 327589 ||  || — || February 27, 2006 || Kitt Peak || Spacewatch || — || align=right | 2.8 km || 
|-id=590 bgcolor=#d6d6d6
| 327590 ||  || — || February 27, 2006 || Kitt Peak || Spacewatch || — || align=right | 3.6 km || 
|-id=591 bgcolor=#d6d6d6
| 327591 ||  || — || February 27, 2006 || Kitt Peak || Spacewatch || — || align=right | 3.7 km || 
|-id=592 bgcolor=#d6d6d6
| 327592 ||  || — || February 27, 2006 || Mount Lemmon || Mount Lemmon Survey || — || align=right | 3.2 km || 
|-id=593 bgcolor=#d6d6d6
| 327593 ||  || — || February 27, 2006 || Kitt Peak || Spacewatch || — || align=right | 2.8 km || 
|-id=594 bgcolor=#d6d6d6
| 327594 ||  || — || February 27, 2006 || Kitt Peak || Spacewatch || EUP || align=right | 3.9 km || 
|-id=595 bgcolor=#d6d6d6
| 327595 ||  || — || September 19, 2003 || Kitt Peak || Spacewatch || EOS || align=right | 1.7 km || 
|-id=596 bgcolor=#d6d6d6
| 327596 ||  || — || January 28, 2006 || Catalina || CSS || — || align=right | 4.1 km || 
|-id=597 bgcolor=#d6d6d6
| 327597 ||  || — || February 22, 2006 || Catalina || CSS || — || align=right | 3.2 km || 
|-id=598 bgcolor=#d6d6d6
| 327598 ||  || — || February 24, 2006 || Catalina || CSS || TIR || align=right | 4.1 km || 
|-id=599 bgcolor=#d6d6d6
| 327599 ||  || — || February 28, 2006 || Catalina || CSS || TIR || align=right | 3.4 km || 
|-id=600 bgcolor=#d6d6d6
| 327600 ||  || — || February 21, 2006 || Catalina || CSS || — || align=right | 4.4 km || 
|}

327601–327700 

|-bgcolor=#d6d6d6
| 327601 ||  || — || February 24, 2006 || Mount Lemmon || Mount Lemmon Survey || THB || align=right | 3.7 km || 
|-id=602 bgcolor=#d6d6d6
| 327602 ||  || — || February 25, 2006 || Mount Lemmon || Mount Lemmon Survey || — || align=right | 5.6 km || 
|-id=603 bgcolor=#d6d6d6
| 327603 ||  || — || March 2, 2006 || Kitt Peak || Spacewatch || — || align=right | 2.6 km || 
|-id=604 bgcolor=#d6d6d6
| 327604 ||  || — || March 2, 2006 || Kitt Peak || Spacewatch || — || align=right | 3.3 km || 
|-id=605 bgcolor=#d6d6d6
| 327605 ||  || — || March 2, 2006 || Kitt Peak || Spacewatch || — || align=right | 4.4 km || 
|-id=606 bgcolor=#d6d6d6
| 327606 ||  || — || March 3, 2006 || Kitt Peak || Spacewatch || — || align=right | 3.6 km || 
|-id=607 bgcolor=#d6d6d6
| 327607 ||  || — || March 3, 2006 || Mount Lemmon || Mount Lemmon Survey || THM || align=right | 2.9 km || 
|-id=608 bgcolor=#d6d6d6
| 327608 ||  || — || March 4, 2006 || Kitt Peak || Spacewatch || — || align=right | 3.4 km || 
|-id=609 bgcolor=#d6d6d6
| 327609 ||  || — || March 4, 2006 || Kitt Peak || Spacewatch || EOS || align=right | 1.7 km || 
|-id=610 bgcolor=#d6d6d6
| 327610 ||  || — || March 4, 2006 || Kitt Peak || Spacewatch || — || align=right | 4.4 km || 
|-id=611 bgcolor=#d6d6d6
| 327611 ||  || — || March 4, 2006 || Mount Lemmon || Mount Lemmon Survey || — || align=right | 4.2 km || 
|-id=612 bgcolor=#d6d6d6
| 327612 ||  || — || March 23, 2006 || Kitt Peak || Spacewatch || — || align=right | 2.6 km || 
|-id=613 bgcolor=#d6d6d6
| 327613 ||  || — || March 23, 2006 || Mount Lemmon || Mount Lemmon Survey || HYG || align=right | 3.2 km || 
|-id=614 bgcolor=#d6d6d6
| 327614 ||  || — || March 23, 2006 || Mount Lemmon || Mount Lemmon Survey || — || align=right | 5.3 km || 
|-id=615 bgcolor=#d6d6d6
| 327615 ||  || — || March 24, 2006 || Mount Lemmon || Mount Lemmon Survey || — || align=right | 2.9 km || 
|-id=616 bgcolor=#d6d6d6
| 327616 ||  || — || March 26, 2006 || Mount Lemmon || Mount Lemmon Survey || — || align=right | 7.0 km || 
|-id=617 bgcolor=#d6d6d6
| 327617 ||  || — || April 2, 2006 || Kitt Peak || Spacewatch || — || align=right | 3.9 km || 
|-id=618 bgcolor=#d6d6d6
| 327618 ||  || — || April 2, 2006 || Kitt Peak || Spacewatch || — || align=right | 3.4 km || 
|-id=619 bgcolor=#d6d6d6
| 327619 ||  || — || April 2, 2006 || Mount Lemmon || Mount Lemmon Survey || EOS || align=right | 2.9 km || 
|-id=620 bgcolor=#d6d6d6
| 327620 ||  || — || April 7, 2006 || Catalina || CSS || Tj (2.98) || align=right | 4.1 km || 
|-id=621 bgcolor=#d6d6d6
| 327621 ||  || — || April 7, 2006 || Mount Lemmon || Mount Lemmon Survey || — || align=right | 3.2 km || 
|-id=622 bgcolor=#d6d6d6
| 327622 ||  || — || April 18, 2006 || Kitt Peak || Spacewatch || — || align=right | 3.0 km || 
|-id=623 bgcolor=#d6d6d6
| 327623 ||  || — || March 29, 2006 || Kitt Peak || Spacewatch || — || align=right | 3.5 km || 
|-id=624 bgcolor=#d6d6d6
| 327624 ||  || — || April 23, 2006 || Anderson Mesa || LONEOS || — || align=right | 4.2 km || 
|-id=625 bgcolor=#d6d6d6
| 327625 ||  || — || December 5, 1999 || Socorro || LINEAR || Tj (2.99) || align=right | 5.6 km || 
|-id=626 bgcolor=#d6d6d6
| 327626 ||  || — || April 25, 2006 || Kitt Peak || Spacewatch || — || align=right | 5.8 km || 
|-id=627 bgcolor=#d6d6d6
| 327627 ||  || — || April 18, 2006 || Catalina || CSS || — || align=right | 5.2 km || 
|-id=628 bgcolor=#d6d6d6
| 327628 ||  || — || May 6, 2006 || Mount Lemmon || Mount Lemmon Survey || — || align=right | 3.9 km || 
|-id=629 bgcolor=#d6d6d6
| 327629 ||  || — || May 23, 2006 || Kitt Peak || Spacewatch || 7:4 || align=right | 4.0 km || 
|-id=630 bgcolor=#d6d6d6
| 327630 ||  || — || June 19, 2006 || Kitt Peak || Spacewatch || 7:4 || align=right | 3.7 km || 
|-id=631 bgcolor=#fefefe
| 327631 ||  || — || July 20, 2006 || Palomar || NEAT || — || align=right data-sort-value="0.81" | 810 m || 
|-id=632 bgcolor=#fefefe
| 327632 Ferrarini ||  ||  || July 24, 2006 || Vicques || M. Ory || FLO || align=right data-sort-value="0.85" | 850 m || 
|-id=633 bgcolor=#fefefe
| 327633 ||  || — || August 12, 2006 || Palomar || NEAT || — || align=right data-sort-value="0.69" | 690 m || 
|-id=634 bgcolor=#fefefe
| 327634 ||  || — || August 12, 2006 || Palomar || NEAT || — || align=right data-sort-value="0.97" | 970 m || 
|-id=635 bgcolor=#fefefe
| 327635 ||  || — || August 12, 2006 || Palomar || NEAT || — || align=right data-sort-value="0.74" | 740 m || 
|-id=636 bgcolor=#fefefe
| 327636 ||  || — || August 13, 2006 || Palomar || NEAT || FLO || align=right data-sort-value="0.61" | 610 m || 
|-id=637 bgcolor=#fefefe
| 327637 ||  || — || August 15, 2006 || Palomar || NEAT || — || align=right data-sort-value="0.97" | 970 m || 
|-id=638 bgcolor=#fefefe
| 327638 ||  || — || August 15, 2006 || Palomar || NEAT || FLO || align=right data-sort-value="0.87" | 870 m || 
|-id=639 bgcolor=#fefefe
| 327639 ||  || — || August 18, 2006 || Kitt Peak || Spacewatch || FLO || align=right data-sort-value="0.63" | 630 m || 
|-id=640 bgcolor=#fefefe
| 327640 ||  || — || August 19, 2006 || Kitt Peak || Spacewatch || — || align=right data-sort-value="0.81" | 810 m || 
|-id=641 bgcolor=#fefefe
| 327641 ||  || — || August 19, 2006 || Kitt Peak || Spacewatch || — || align=right data-sort-value="0.77" | 770 m || 
|-id=642 bgcolor=#fefefe
| 327642 ||  || — || August 18, 2006 || Reedy Creek || J. Broughton || — || align=right data-sort-value="0.91" | 910 m || 
|-id=643 bgcolor=#fefefe
| 327643 ||  || — || August 18, 2006 || Reedy Creek || J. Broughton || FLO || align=right data-sort-value="0.79" | 790 m || 
|-id=644 bgcolor=#fefefe
| 327644 ||  || — || August 16, 2006 || Siding Spring || SSS || V || align=right data-sort-value="0.84" | 840 m || 
|-id=645 bgcolor=#fefefe
| 327645 ||  || — || August 17, 2006 || Palomar || NEAT || — || align=right data-sort-value="0.84" | 840 m || 
|-id=646 bgcolor=#fefefe
| 327646 ||  || — || August 17, 2006 || Palomar || NEAT || NYS || align=right data-sort-value="0.84" | 840 m || 
|-id=647 bgcolor=#fefefe
| 327647 ||  || — || August 19, 2006 || Anderson Mesa || LONEOS || — || align=right data-sort-value="0.85" | 850 m || 
|-id=648 bgcolor=#fefefe
| 327648 ||  || — || August 19, 2006 || Palomar || NEAT || — || align=right | 1.1 km || 
|-id=649 bgcolor=#fefefe
| 327649 ||  || — || August 19, 2006 || Kitt Peak || Spacewatch || — || align=right data-sort-value="0.74" | 740 m || 
|-id=650 bgcolor=#fefefe
| 327650 ||  || — || August 21, 2006 || Socorro || LINEAR || — || align=right data-sort-value="0.89" | 890 m || 
|-id=651 bgcolor=#fefefe
| 327651 ||  || — || August 22, 2006 || Palomar || NEAT || — || align=right | 1.1 km || 
|-id=652 bgcolor=#fefefe
| 327652 ||  || — || August 16, 2006 || Lulin Observatory || C.-S. Lin, Q.-z. Ye || FLO || align=right data-sort-value="0.76" | 760 m || 
|-id=653 bgcolor=#fefefe
| 327653 ||  || — || August 18, 2006 || Socorro || LINEAR || — || align=right | 1.1 km || 
|-id=654 bgcolor=#fefefe
| 327654 ||  || — || August 20, 2006 || Palomar || NEAT || — || align=right data-sort-value="0.68" | 680 m || 
|-id=655 bgcolor=#fefefe
| 327655 ||  || — || August 19, 2006 || Anderson Mesa || LONEOS || — || align=right | 1.2 km || 
|-id=656 bgcolor=#fefefe
| 327656 ||  || — || August 21, 2006 || Socorro || LINEAR || V || align=right data-sort-value="0.89" | 890 m || 
|-id=657 bgcolor=#fefefe
| 327657 ||  || — || August 22, 2006 || Palomar || NEAT || — || align=right | 1.0 km || 
|-id=658 bgcolor=#fefefe
| 327658 ||  || — || August 22, 2006 || Palomar || NEAT || — || align=right | 1.2 km || 
|-id=659 bgcolor=#FA8072
| 327659 ||  || — || August 22, 2006 || Palomar || NEAT || — || align=right data-sort-value="0.97" | 970 m || 
|-id=660 bgcolor=#fefefe
| 327660 ||  || — || August 27, 2006 || Kitt Peak || Spacewatch || — || align=right data-sort-value="0.80" | 800 m || 
|-id=661 bgcolor=#fefefe
| 327661 ||  || — || August 16, 2006 || Palomar || NEAT || — || align=right data-sort-value="0.97" | 970 m || 
|-id=662 bgcolor=#d6d6d6
| 327662 ||  || — || August 22, 2006 || Palomar || NEAT || 3:2 || align=right | 4.7 km || 
|-id=663 bgcolor=#fefefe
| 327663 ||  || — || August 24, 2006 || Socorro || LINEAR || — || align=right data-sort-value="0.69" | 690 m || 
|-id=664 bgcolor=#fefefe
| 327664 ||  || — || August 24, 2006 || Palomar || NEAT || V || align=right data-sort-value="0.73" | 730 m || 
|-id=665 bgcolor=#fefefe
| 327665 ||  || — || August 29, 2006 || Catalina || CSS || — || align=right | 1.0 km || 
|-id=666 bgcolor=#fefefe
| 327666 ||  || — || August 27, 2006 || Anderson Mesa || LONEOS || V || align=right data-sort-value="0.68" | 680 m || 
|-id=667 bgcolor=#fefefe
| 327667 ||  || — || May 24, 2006 || Mount Lemmon || Mount Lemmon Survey || V || align=right data-sort-value="0.74" | 740 m || 
|-id=668 bgcolor=#fefefe
| 327668 ||  || — || August 19, 2006 || Kitt Peak || Spacewatch || — || align=right data-sort-value="0.82" | 820 m || 
|-id=669 bgcolor=#fefefe
| 327669 ||  || — || August 28, 2006 || Anderson Mesa || LONEOS || NYS || align=right data-sort-value="0.70" | 700 m || 
|-id=670 bgcolor=#fefefe
| 327670 ||  || — || August 16, 2006 || Siding Spring || SSS || FLO || align=right data-sort-value="0.73" | 730 m || 
|-id=671 bgcolor=#fefefe
| 327671 ||  || — || September 12, 2006 || Catalina || CSS || FLO || align=right data-sort-value="0.79" | 790 m || 
|-id=672 bgcolor=#fefefe
| 327672 ||  || — || September 12, 2006 || Catalina || CSS || — || align=right data-sort-value="0.83" | 830 m || 
|-id=673 bgcolor=#fefefe
| 327673 ||  || — || August 28, 2006 || Catalina || CSS || — || align=right data-sort-value="0.87" | 870 m || 
|-id=674 bgcolor=#E9E9E9
| 327674 ||  || — || September 14, 2006 || Palomar || NEAT || — || align=right | 1.1 km || 
|-id=675 bgcolor=#fefefe
| 327675 ||  || — || September 12, 2006 || Catalina || CSS || — || align=right data-sort-value="0.85" | 850 m || 
|-id=676 bgcolor=#fefefe
| 327676 ||  || — || September 13, 2006 || Palomar || NEAT || — || align=right | 1.1 km || 
|-id=677 bgcolor=#fefefe
| 327677 ||  || — || September 15, 2006 || Socorro || LINEAR || — || align=right data-sort-value="0.94" | 940 m || 
|-id=678 bgcolor=#fefefe
| 327678 ||  || — || September 15, 2006 || Kitt Peak || Spacewatch || — || align=right | 1.0 km || 
|-id=679 bgcolor=#fefefe
| 327679 ||  || — || September 12, 2006 || Catalina || CSS || V || align=right data-sort-value="0.79" | 790 m || 
|-id=680 bgcolor=#fefefe
| 327680 ||  || — || September 14, 2006 || Catalina || CSS || — || align=right data-sort-value="0.93" | 930 m || 
|-id=681 bgcolor=#fefefe
| 327681 ||  || — || September 14, 2006 || Kitt Peak || Spacewatch || — || align=right data-sort-value="0.89" | 890 m || 
|-id=682 bgcolor=#fefefe
| 327682 ||  || — || September 14, 2006 || Kitt Peak || Spacewatch || — || align=right data-sort-value="0.91" | 910 m || 
|-id=683 bgcolor=#fefefe
| 327683 ||  || — || September 14, 2006 || Kitt Peak || Spacewatch || V || align=right data-sort-value="0.91" | 910 m || 
|-id=684 bgcolor=#fefefe
| 327684 ||  || — || September 14, 2006 || Kitt Peak || Spacewatch || — || align=right data-sort-value="0.91" | 910 m || 
|-id=685 bgcolor=#fefefe
| 327685 ||  || — || September 14, 2006 || Kitt Peak || Spacewatch || — || align=right data-sort-value="0.91" | 910 m || 
|-id=686 bgcolor=#fefefe
| 327686 ||  || — || September 15, 2006 || Kitt Peak || Spacewatch || FLO || align=right data-sort-value="0.75" | 750 m || 
|-id=687 bgcolor=#fefefe
| 327687 ||  || — || September 15, 2006 || Kitt Peak || Spacewatch || — || align=right data-sort-value="0.74" | 740 m || 
|-id=688 bgcolor=#fefefe
| 327688 ||  || — || September 15, 2006 || Kitt Peak || Spacewatch || V || align=right data-sort-value="0.74" | 740 m || 
|-id=689 bgcolor=#fefefe
| 327689 ||  || — || September 15, 2006 || Kitt Peak || Spacewatch || — || align=right data-sort-value="0.90" | 900 m || 
|-id=690 bgcolor=#fefefe
| 327690 ||  || — || September 15, 2006 || Kitt Peak || Spacewatch || V || align=right data-sort-value="0.57" | 570 m || 
|-id=691 bgcolor=#fefefe
| 327691 ||  || — || September 15, 2006 || Kitt Peak || Spacewatch || — || align=right data-sort-value="0.62" | 620 m || 
|-id=692 bgcolor=#fefefe
| 327692 ||  || — || September 14, 2006 || Kitt Peak || Spacewatch || FLO || align=right data-sort-value="0.70" | 700 m || 
|-id=693 bgcolor=#fefefe
| 327693 ||  || — || September 15, 2006 || Kitt Peak || Spacewatch || — || align=right data-sort-value="0.83" | 830 m || 
|-id=694 bgcolor=#fefefe
| 327694 ||  || — || September 14, 2006 || Mauna Kea || J. Masiero || NYS || align=right data-sort-value="0.66" | 660 m || 
|-id=695 bgcolor=#fefefe
| 327695 Yokoono ||  ||  || September 14, 2006 || Mauna Kea || J. Masiero || FLO || align=right data-sort-value="0.51" | 510 m || 
|-id=696 bgcolor=#fefefe
| 327696 ||  || — || September 16, 2006 || Catalina || CSS || V || align=right data-sort-value="0.84" | 840 m || 
|-id=697 bgcolor=#fefefe
| 327697 ||  || — || September 17, 2006 || Anderson Mesa || LONEOS || FLO || align=right data-sort-value="0.77" | 770 m || 
|-id=698 bgcolor=#fefefe
| 327698 ||  || — || September 17, 2006 || Catalina || CSS || — || align=right data-sort-value="0.86" | 860 m || 
|-id=699 bgcolor=#fefefe
| 327699 ||  || — || September 17, 2006 || Catalina || CSS || — || align=right data-sort-value="0.84" | 840 m || 
|-id=700 bgcolor=#fefefe
| 327700 ||  || — || September 17, 2006 || Catalina || CSS || — || align=right data-sort-value="0.90" | 900 m || 
|}

327701–327800 

|-bgcolor=#fefefe
| 327701 ||  || — || September 17, 2006 || Kitt Peak || Spacewatch || — || align=right data-sort-value="0.87" | 870 m || 
|-id=702 bgcolor=#fefefe
| 327702 ||  || — || September 17, 2006 || Anderson Mesa || LONEOS || FLO || align=right data-sort-value="0.73" | 730 m || 
|-id=703 bgcolor=#fefefe
| 327703 ||  || — || September 17, 2006 || Anderson Mesa || LONEOS || FLO || align=right data-sort-value="0.97" | 970 m || 
|-id=704 bgcolor=#fefefe
| 327704 ||  || — || September 17, 2006 || Kitt Peak || Spacewatch || — || align=right | 1.2 km || 
|-id=705 bgcolor=#fefefe
| 327705 ||  || — || September 18, 2006 || Anderson Mesa || LONEOS || — || align=right | 1.1 km || 
|-id=706 bgcolor=#fefefe
| 327706 ||  || — || September 18, 2006 || Anderson Mesa || LONEOS || — || align=right data-sort-value="0.99" | 990 m || 
|-id=707 bgcolor=#fefefe
| 327707 ||  || — || September 18, 2006 || Catalina || CSS || V || align=right data-sort-value="0.89" | 890 m || 
|-id=708 bgcolor=#fefefe
| 327708 ||  || — || September 18, 2006 || Catalina || CSS || — || align=right data-sort-value="0.94" | 940 m || 
|-id=709 bgcolor=#fefefe
| 327709 ||  || — || September 19, 2006 || Kitt Peak || Spacewatch || — || align=right data-sort-value="0.89" | 890 m || 
|-id=710 bgcolor=#FA8072
| 327710 ||  || — || September 19, 2006 || Socorro || LINEAR || — || align=right | 1.2 km || 
|-id=711 bgcolor=#fefefe
| 327711 ||  || — || September 18, 2006 || Kitt Peak || Spacewatch || — || align=right data-sort-value="0.85" | 850 m || 
|-id=712 bgcolor=#fefefe
| 327712 ||  || — || September 18, 2006 || Kitt Peak || Spacewatch || V || align=right data-sort-value="0.69" | 690 m || 
|-id=713 bgcolor=#fefefe
| 327713 ||  || — || September 19, 2006 || Kitt Peak || Spacewatch || — || align=right data-sort-value="0.70" | 700 m || 
|-id=714 bgcolor=#d6d6d6
| 327714 ||  || — || September 20, 2006 || Catalina || CSS || HIL3:2 || align=right | 7.5 km || 
|-id=715 bgcolor=#fefefe
| 327715 ||  || — || September 20, 2006 || Palomar || NEAT || — || align=right | 1.2 km || 
|-id=716 bgcolor=#fefefe
| 327716 ||  || — || September 20, 2006 || Catalina || CSS || V || align=right data-sort-value="0.85" | 850 m || 
|-id=717 bgcolor=#fefefe
| 327717 ||  || — || May 15, 2005 || Mount Lemmon || Mount Lemmon Survey || V || align=right data-sort-value="0.85" | 850 m || 
|-id=718 bgcolor=#FA8072
| 327718 ||  || — || September 21, 2006 || Anderson Mesa || LONEOS || — || align=right data-sort-value="0.71" | 710 m || 
|-id=719 bgcolor=#fefefe
| 327719 ||  || — || September 21, 2006 || Anderson Mesa || LONEOS || — || align=right | 1.00 km || 
|-id=720 bgcolor=#fefefe
| 327720 ||  || — || September 21, 2006 || Anderson Mesa || LONEOS || — || align=right data-sort-value="0.95" | 950 m || 
|-id=721 bgcolor=#fefefe
| 327721 ||  || — || September 23, 2006 || Kitt Peak || Spacewatch || — || align=right data-sort-value="0.75" | 750 m || 
|-id=722 bgcolor=#fefefe
| 327722 ||  || — || September 23, 2006 || Kitt Peak || Spacewatch || — || align=right data-sort-value="0.74" | 740 m || 
|-id=723 bgcolor=#fefefe
| 327723 ||  || — || September 23, 2006 || Kitt Peak || Spacewatch || — || align=right data-sort-value="0.91" | 910 m || 
|-id=724 bgcolor=#fefefe
| 327724 ||  || — || September 25, 2006 || Mount Lemmon || Mount Lemmon Survey || FLO || align=right data-sort-value="0.59" | 590 m || 
|-id=725 bgcolor=#fefefe
| 327725 ||  || — || September 26, 2006 || Kitt Peak || Spacewatch || MAS || align=right data-sort-value="0.65" | 650 m || 
|-id=726 bgcolor=#fefefe
| 327726 ||  || — || September 26, 2006 || Kitt Peak || Spacewatch || — || align=right data-sort-value="0.73" | 730 m || 
|-id=727 bgcolor=#fefefe
| 327727 ||  || — || September 25, 2006 || Mount Lemmon || Mount Lemmon Survey || — || align=right data-sort-value="0.65" | 650 m || 
|-id=728 bgcolor=#fefefe
| 327728 ||  || — || September 26, 2006 || Mount Lemmon || Mount Lemmon Survey || — || align=right data-sort-value="0.81" | 810 m || 
|-id=729 bgcolor=#fefefe
| 327729 ||  || — || September 27, 2006 || Socorro || LINEAR || FLO || align=right data-sort-value="0.77" | 770 m || 
|-id=730 bgcolor=#fefefe
| 327730 ||  || — || September 28, 2006 || Kitt Peak || Spacewatch || V || align=right data-sort-value="0.76" | 760 m || 
|-id=731 bgcolor=#fefefe
| 327731 ||  || — || September 26, 2006 || Socorro || LINEAR || — || align=right data-sort-value="0.99" | 990 m || 
|-id=732 bgcolor=#fefefe
| 327732 ||  || — || September 26, 2006 || Socorro || LINEAR || FLO || align=right data-sort-value="0.84" | 840 m || 
|-id=733 bgcolor=#fefefe
| 327733 ||  || — || September 26, 2006 || Catalina || CSS || V || align=right data-sort-value="0.77" | 770 m || 
|-id=734 bgcolor=#fefefe
| 327734 ||  || — || September 27, 2006 || Kitt Peak || Spacewatch || FLO || align=right data-sort-value="0.73" | 730 m || 
|-id=735 bgcolor=#fefefe
| 327735 ||  || — || September 27, 2006 || Kitt Peak || Spacewatch || NYS || align=right data-sort-value="0.79" | 790 m || 
|-id=736 bgcolor=#fefefe
| 327736 ||  || — || September 27, 2006 || Kitt Peak || Spacewatch || V || align=right data-sort-value="0.71" | 710 m || 
|-id=737 bgcolor=#fefefe
| 327737 ||  || — || September 28, 2006 || Kitt Peak || Spacewatch || — || align=right data-sort-value="0.80" | 800 m || 
|-id=738 bgcolor=#fefefe
| 327738 ||  || — || September 30, 2006 || Catalina || CSS || — || align=right data-sort-value="0.85" | 850 m || 
|-id=739 bgcolor=#fefefe
| 327739 ||  || — || September 30, 2006 || Catalina || CSS || FLO || align=right data-sort-value="0.71" | 710 m || 
|-id=740 bgcolor=#fefefe
| 327740 ||  || — || September 28, 2006 || Mount Lemmon || Mount Lemmon Survey || V || align=right data-sort-value="0.83" | 830 m || 
|-id=741 bgcolor=#fefefe
| 327741 ||  || — || September 30, 2006 || Catalina || CSS || V || align=right data-sort-value="0.76" | 760 m || 
|-id=742 bgcolor=#fefefe
| 327742 ||  || — || September 18, 2006 || Catalina || CSS || — || align=right data-sort-value="0.74" | 740 m || 
|-id=743 bgcolor=#fefefe
| 327743 ||  || — || October 1, 2006 || Kitt Peak || Spacewatch || — || align=right data-sort-value="0.83" | 830 m || 
|-id=744 bgcolor=#fefefe
| 327744 ||  || — || October 11, 2006 || Kitt Peak || Spacewatch || — || align=right data-sort-value="0.89" | 890 m || 
|-id=745 bgcolor=#FA8072
| 327745 ||  || — || October 12, 2006 || Kitt Peak || Spacewatch || — || align=right data-sort-value="0.86" | 860 m || 
|-id=746 bgcolor=#E9E9E9
| 327746 ||  || — || October 12, 2006 || Kitt Peak || Spacewatch || — || align=right data-sort-value="0.91" | 910 m || 
|-id=747 bgcolor=#fefefe
| 327747 ||  || — || October 12, 2006 || Palomar || NEAT || V || align=right data-sort-value="0.83" | 830 m || 
|-id=748 bgcolor=#fefefe
| 327748 ||  || — || October 12, 2006 || Palomar || NEAT || — || align=right data-sort-value="0.91" | 910 m || 
|-id=749 bgcolor=#fefefe
| 327749 ||  || — || October 11, 2006 || Palomar || NEAT || slow || align=right | 1.1 km || 
|-id=750 bgcolor=#E9E9E9
| 327750 ||  || — || October 11, 2006 || Palomar || NEAT || — || align=right | 1.6 km || 
|-id=751 bgcolor=#fefefe
| 327751 ||  || — || October 11, 2006 || Palomar || NEAT || — || align=right | 1.1 km || 
|-id=752 bgcolor=#fefefe
| 327752 ||  || — || October 11, 2006 || Palomar || NEAT || — || align=right | 1.1 km || 
|-id=753 bgcolor=#fefefe
| 327753 ||  || — || October 4, 2006 || Mount Lemmon || Mount Lemmon Survey || FLOfast? || align=right data-sort-value="0.57" | 570 m || 
|-id=754 bgcolor=#fefefe
| 327754 ||  || — || October 12, 2006 || Kitt Peak || Spacewatch || — || align=right data-sort-value="0.81" | 810 m || 
|-id=755 bgcolor=#fefefe
| 327755 ||  || — || October 2, 2006 || Mount Lemmon || Mount Lemmon Survey || FLO || align=right data-sort-value="0.75" | 750 m || 
|-id=756 bgcolor=#fefefe
| 327756 ||  || — || October 2, 2006 || Mount Lemmon || Mount Lemmon Survey || — || align=right data-sort-value="0.85" | 850 m || 
|-id=757 bgcolor=#fefefe
| 327757 ||  || — || October 16, 2006 || Catalina || CSS || ERI || align=right | 1.8 km || 
|-id=758 bgcolor=#fefefe
| 327758 ||  || — || October 17, 2006 || Mount Lemmon || Mount Lemmon Survey || — || align=right data-sort-value="0.93" | 930 m || 
|-id=759 bgcolor=#E9E9E9
| 327759 ||  || — || October 16, 2006 || Kitt Peak || Spacewatch || — || align=right data-sort-value="0.83" | 830 m || 
|-id=760 bgcolor=#E9E9E9
| 327760 ||  || — || October 16, 2006 || Kitt Peak || Spacewatch || — || align=right | 1.0 km || 
|-id=761 bgcolor=#fefefe
| 327761 ||  || — || October 16, 2006 || Kitt Peak || Spacewatch || FLO || align=right data-sort-value="0.77" | 770 m || 
|-id=762 bgcolor=#fefefe
| 327762 ||  || — || October 17, 2006 || Catalina || CSS || — || align=right data-sort-value="0.93" | 930 m || 
|-id=763 bgcolor=#fefefe
| 327763 ||  || — || October 17, 2006 || Mount Lemmon || Mount Lemmon Survey || V || align=right data-sort-value="0.80" | 800 m || 
|-id=764 bgcolor=#d6d6d6
| 327764 ||  || — || October 17, 2006 || Catalina || CSS || Tj (2.96) || align=right | 5.5 km || 
|-id=765 bgcolor=#fefefe
| 327765 ||  || — || October 16, 2006 || Catalina || CSS || — || align=right data-sort-value="0.90" | 900 m || 
|-id=766 bgcolor=#fefefe
| 327766 ||  || — || October 16, 2006 || Catalina || CSS || NYS || align=right data-sort-value="0.73" | 730 m || 
|-id=767 bgcolor=#fefefe
| 327767 ||  || — || October 17, 2006 || Kitt Peak || Spacewatch || — || align=right data-sort-value="0.93" | 930 m || 
|-id=768 bgcolor=#fefefe
| 327768 ||  || — || October 17, 2006 || Kitt Peak || Spacewatch || — || align=right data-sort-value="0.88" | 880 m || 
|-id=769 bgcolor=#fefefe
| 327769 ||  || — || October 17, 2006 || Mount Lemmon || Mount Lemmon Survey || V || align=right data-sort-value="0.65" | 650 m || 
|-id=770 bgcolor=#fefefe
| 327770 ||  || — || October 17, 2006 || Mount Lemmon || Mount Lemmon Survey || — || align=right | 1.0 km || 
|-id=771 bgcolor=#fefefe
| 327771 ||  || — || October 18, 2006 || Bergisch Gladbach || W. Bickel || FLO || align=right data-sort-value="0.81" | 810 m || 
|-id=772 bgcolor=#fefefe
| 327772 ||  || — || October 18, 2006 || Kitt Peak || Spacewatch || FLO || align=right data-sort-value="0.80" | 800 m || 
|-id=773 bgcolor=#fefefe
| 327773 ||  || — || October 18, 2006 || Kitt Peak || Spacewatch || CLA || align=right | 2.0 km || 
|-id=774 bgcolor=#fefefe
| 327774 ||  || — || October 19, 2006 || Kitt Peak || Spacewatch || — || align=right data-sort-value="0.74" | 740 m || 
|-id=775 bgcolor=#fefefe
| 327775 ||  || — || October 19, 2006 || Kitt Peak || Spacewatch || — || align=right data-sort-value="0.75" | 750 m || 
|-id=776 bgcolor=#fefefe
| 327776 ||  || — || October 19, 2006 || Kitt Peak || Spacewatch || V || align=right data-sort-value="0.60" | 600 m || 
|-id=777 bgcolor=#fefefe
| 327777 ||  || — || October 20, 2006 || Kitt Peak || Spacewatch || — || align=right data-sort-value="0.70" | 700 m || 
|-id=778 bgcolor=#fefefe
| 327778 ||  || — || October 21, 2006 || Catalina || CSS || FLO || align=right data-sort-value="0.75" | 750 m || 
|-id=779 bgcolor=#fefefe
| 327779 ||  || — || October 16, 2006 || Catalina || CSS || CLA || align=right | 2.0 km || 
|-id=780 bgcolor=#fefefe
| 327780 ||  || — || October 16, 2006 || Catalina || CSS || — || align=right data-sort-value="0.85" | 850 m || 
|-id=781 bgcolor=#fefefe
| 327781 ||  || — || October 16, 2006 || Catalina || CSS || — || align=right data-sort-value="0.86" | 860 m || 
|-id=782 bgcolor=#fefefe
| 327782 ||  || — || October 16, 2006 || Catalina || CSS || V || align=right data-sort-value="0.66" | 660 m || 
|-id=783 bgcolor=#fefefe
| 327783 ||  || — || October 16, 2006 || Catalina || CSS || — || align=right | 1.1 km || 
|-id=784 bgcolor=#fefefe
| 327784 ||  || — || October 19, 2006 || Catalina || CSS || — || align=right | 1.0 km || 
|-id=785 bgcolor=#fefefe
| 327785 ||  || — || October 19, 2006 || Catalina || CSS || — || align=right | 1.2 km || 
|-id=786 bgcolor=#fefefe
| 327786 ||  || — || October 20, 2006 || Kitt Peak || Spacewatch || V || align=right data-sort-value="0.77" | 770 m || 
|-id=787 bgcolor=#fefefe
| 327787 ||  || — || October 20, 2006 || Kitt Peak || Spacewatch || — || align=right data-sort-value="0.97" | 970 m || 
|-id=788 bgcolor=#E9E9E9
| 327788 ||  || — || October 20, 2006 || Kitt Peak || Spacewatch || — || align=right | 1.3 km || 
|-id=789 bgcolor=#fefefe
| 327789 ||  || — || October 17, 2006 || Kitt Peak || Spacewatch || — || align=right data-sort-value="0.82" | 820 m || 
|-id=790 bgcolor=#fefefe
| 327790 ||  || — || October 17, 2006 || Catalina || CSS || FLO || align=right | 1.1 km || 
|-id=791 bgcolor=#fefefe
| 327791 ||  || — || October 3, 2006 || Mount Lemmon || Mount Lemmon Survey || — || align=right | 1.1 km || 
|-id=792 bgcolor=#fefefe
| 327792 ||  || — || October 21, 2006 || Palomar || NEAT || V || align=right data-sort-value="0.69" | 690 m || 
|-id=793 bgcolor=#fefefe
| 327793 ||  || — || October 27, 2006 || Mount Lemmon || Mount Lemmon Survey || — || align=right data-sort-value="0.89" | 890 m || 
|-id=794 bgcolor=#FA8072
| 327794 ||  || — || October 27, 2006 || Catalina || CSS || — || align=right | 3.3 km || 
|-id=795 bgcolor=#E9E9E9
| 327795 ||  || — || October 28, 2006 || Mount Lemmon || Mount Lemmon Survey || — || align=right data-sort-value="0.89" | 890 m || 
|-id=796 bgcolor=#E9E9E9
| 327796 ||  || — || October 28, 2006 || Mount Lemmon || Mount Lemmon Survey || — || align=right | 1.0 km || 
|-id=797 bgcolor=#fefefe
| 327797 ||  || — || October 28, 2006 || Mount Lemmon || Mount Lemmon Survey || V || align=right data-sort-value="0.79" | 790 m || 
|-id=798 bgcolor=#fefefe
| 327798 ||  || — || October 19, 2006 || Mount Lemmon || Mount Lemmon Survey || V || align=right data-sort-value="0.87" | 870 m || 
|-id=799 bgcolor=#fefefe
| 327799 ||  || — || October 16, 2006 || Catalina || CSS || — || align=right | 1.1 km || 
|-id=800 bgcolor=#fefefe
| 327800 ||  || — || November 1, 2006 || Mount Lemmon || Mount Lemmon Survey || MAS || align=right data-sort-value="0.87" | 870 m || 
|}

327801–327900 

|-bgcolor=#fefefe
| 327801 ||  || — || November 10, 2006 || Kitt Peak || Spacewatch || — || align=right data-sort-value="0.85" | 850 m || 
|-id=802 bgcolor=#fefefe
| 327802 ||  || — || October 19, 2006 || Kitt Peak || Spacewatch || V || align=right data-sort-value="0.86" | 860 m || 
|-id=803 bgcolor=#fefefe
| 327803 ||  || — || November 10, 2006 || Kitt Peak || Spacewatch || — || align=right data-sort-value="0.89" | 890 m || 
|-id=804 bgcolor=#fefefe
| 327804 ||  || — || November 10, 2006 || Kitt Peak || Spacewatch || V || align=right data-sort-value="0.80" | 800 m || 
|-id=805 bgcolor=#fefefe
| 327805 ||  || — || November 10, 2006 || Kitt Peak || Spacewatch || — || align=right | 1.0 km || 
|-id=806 bgcolor=#E9E9E9
| 327806 ||  || — || November 10, 2006 || Kitt Peak || Spacewatch || — || align=right | 4.6 km || 
|-id=807 bgcolor=#E9E9E9
| 327807 ||  || — || November 10, 2006 || Kitt Peak || Spacewatch || — || align=right data-sort-value="0.99" | 990 m || 
|-id=808 bgcolor=#fefefe
| 327808 ||  || — || October 20, 2006 || Kitt Peak || Spacewatch || — || align=right data-sort-value="0.90" | 900 m || 
|-id=809 bgcolor=#fefefe
| 327809 ||  || — || November 12, 2006 || Mount Lemmon || Mount Lemmon Survey || — || align=right | 1.0 km || 
|-id=810 bgcolor=#fefefe
| 327810 ||  || — || November 10, 2006 || Kitt Peak || Spacewatch || V || align=right data-sort-value="0.90" | 900 m || 
|-id=811 bgcolor=#fefefe
| 327811 ||  || — || November 10, 2006 || Kitt Peak || Spacewatch || — || align=right | 1.1 km || 
|-id=812 bgcolor=#fefefe
| 327812 ||  || — || November 11, 2006 || Kitt Peak || Spacewatch || V || align=right data-sort-value="0.74" | 740 m || 
|-id=813 bgcolor=#fefefe
| 327813 ||  || — || October 19, 2006 || Mount Lemmon || Mount Lemmon Survey || — || align=right | 1.1 km || 
|-id=814 bgcolor=#E9E9E9
| 327814 ||  || — || November 11, 2006 || Mount Lemmon || Mount Lemmon Survey || — || align=right | 1.3 km || 
|-id=815 bgcolor=#fefefe
| 327815 ||  || — || November 12, 2006 || Mount Lemmon || Mount Lemmon Survey || — || align=right | 1.1 km || 
|-id=816 bgcolor=#fefefe
| 327816 ||  || — || November 13, 2006 || Kitt Peak || Spacewatch || V || align=right data-sort-value="0.92" | 920 m || 
|-id=817 bgcolor=#fefefe
| 327817 ||  || — || November 15, 2006 || Kitt Peak || Spacewatch || — || align=right data-sort-value="0.79" | 790 m || 
|-id=818 bgcolor=#fefefe
| 327818 ||  || — || November 9, 2006 || Palomar || NEAT || — || align=right data-sort-value="0.87" | 870 m || 
|-id=819 bgcolor=#fefefe
| 327819 ||  || — || November 9, 2006 || Palomar || NEAT || V || align=right data-sort-value="0.84" | 840 m || 
|-id=820 bgcolor=#E9E9E9
| 327820 ||  || — || November 13, 2006 || Catalina || CSS || — || align=right | 1.0 km || 
|-id=821 bgcolor=#fefefe
| 327821 ||  || — || November 10, 2006 || Kitt Peak || Spacewatch || V || align=right data-sort-value="0.84" | 840 m || 
|-id=822 bgcolor=#fefefe
| 327822 ||  || — || November 17, 2006 || Kitt Peak || Spacewatch || V || align=right data-sort-value="0.86" | 860 m || 
|-id=823 bgcolor=#fefefe
| 327823 ||  || — || November 17, 2006 || Mount Lemmon || Mount Lemmon Survey || — || align=right data-sort-value="0.85" | 850 m || 
|-id=824 bgcolor=#E9E9E9
| 327824 ||  || — || November 17, 2006 || Mount Lemmon || Mount Lemmon Survey || — || align=right | 1.3 km || 
|-id=825 bgcolor=#E9E9E9
| 327825 ||  || — || November 17, 2006 || Mount Lemmon || Mount Lemmon Survey || — || align=right | 1.9 km || 
|-id=826 bgcolor=#fefefe
| 327826 ||  || — || November 16, 2006 || Kitt Peak || Spacewatch || — || align=right data-sort-value="0.74" | 740 m || 
|-id=827 bgcolor=#fefefe
| 327827 ||  || — || November 16, 2006 || Mount Lemmon || Mount Lemmon Survey || V || align=right data-sort-value="0.66" | 660 m || 
|-id=828 bgcolor=#fefefe
| 327828 ||  || — || November 16, 2006 || Kitt Peak || Spacewatch || — || align=right data-sort-value="0.99" | 990 m || 
|-id=829 bgcolor=#E9E9E9
| 327829 ||  || — || November 16, 2006 || Kitt Peak || Spacewatch || — || align=right | 1.1 km || 
|-id=830 bgcolor=#E9E9E9
| 327830 ||  || — || November 16, 2006 || Mount Lemmon || Mount Lemmon Survey || ADE || align=right | 2.3 km || 
|-id=831 bgcolor=#fefefe
| 327831 ||  || — || November 17, 2006 || Mount Lemmon || Mount Lemmon Survey || — || align=right data-sort-value="0.94" | 940 m || 
|-id=832 bgcolor=#E9E9E9
| 327832 ||  || — || November 17, 2006 || Kitt Peak || Spacewatch || — || align=right | 1.2 km || 
|-id=833 bgcolor=#fefefe
| 327833 ||  || — || November 17, 2006 || Mount Lemmon || Mount Lemmon Survey || — || align=right data-sort-value="0.95" | 950 m || 
|-id=834 bgcolor=#fefefe
| 327834 ||  || — || November 18, 2006 || Kitt Peak || Spacewatch || — || align=right | 1.0 km || 
|-id=835 bgcolor=#E9E9E9
| 327835 ||  || — || November 18, 2006 || Socorro || LINEAR || — || align=right | 1.9 km || 
|-id=836 bgcolor=#E9E9E9
| 327836 ||  || — || November 18, 2006 || Kitt Peak || Spacewatch || MIS || align=right | 2.3 km || 
|-id=837 bgcolor=#E9E9E9
| 327837 ||  || — || September 27, 2006 || Mount Lemmon || Mount Lemmon Survey || — || align=right | 1.1 km || 
|-id=838 bgcolor=#E9E9E9
| 327838 ||  || — || November 18, 2006 || Socorro || LINEAR || — || align=right | 2.1 km || 
|-id=839 bgcolor=#E9E9E9
| 327839 ||  || — || November 18, 2006 || Socorro || LINEAR || BAR || align=right | 1.6 km || 
|-id=840 bgcolor=#E9E9E9
| 327840 ||  || — || November 19, 2006 || Kitt Peak || Spacewatch || — || align=right data-sort-value="0.85" | 850 m || 
|-id=841 bgcolor=#E9E9E9
| 327841 ||  || — || November 19, 2006 || Kitt Peak || Spacewatch || — || align=right | 1.1 km || 
|-id=842 bgcolor=#E9E9E9
| 327842 ||  || — || November 22, 2006 || Socorro || LINEAR || JUN || align=right | 3.4 km || 
|-id=843 bgcolor=#E9E9E9
| 327843 ||  || — || November 15, 2006 || Catalina || CSS || — || align=right | 2.2 km || 
|-id=844 bgcolor=#E9E9E9
| 327844 ||  || — || November 27, 2006 || Mount Lemmon || Mount Lemmon Survey || — || align=right | 1.2 km || 
|-id=845 bgcolor=#E9E9E9
| 327845 ||  || — || November 27, 2006 || Kitt Peak || Spacewatch || — || align=right | 1.1 km || 
|-id=846 bgcolor=#fefefe
| 327846 ||  || — || November 17, 2006 || Kitt Peak || Spacewatch || MAS || align=right data-sort-value="0.93" | 930 m || 
|-id=847 bgcolor=#E9E9E9
| 327847 ||  || — || November 27, 2006 || Mount Lemmon || Mount Lemmon Survey || — || align=right | 1.9 km || 
|-id=848 bgcolor=#fefefe
| 327848 ||  || — || December 11, 2006 || 7300 Observatory || W. K. Y. Yeung || MAS || align=right data-sort-value="0.74" | 740 m || 
|-id=849 bgcolor=#E9E9E9
| 327849 ||  || — || December 9, 2006 || Palomar || NEAT || — || align=right | 1.6 km || 
|-id=850 bgcolor=#E9E9E9
| 327850 ||  || — || December 12, 2006 || Anderson Mesa || LONEOS || — || align=right | 1.2 km || 
|-id=851 bgcolor=#fefefe
| 327851 ||  || — || December 12, 2006 || Mount Lemmon || Mount Lemmon Survey || NYS || align=right | 1.0 km || 
|-id=852 bgcolor=#fefefe
| 327852 ||  || — || December 13, 2006 || Mount Lemmon || Mount Lemmon Survey || LCI || align=right | 1.1 km || 
|-id=853 bgcolor=#E9E9E9
| 327853 ||  || — || December 13, 2006 || Mount Lemmon || Mount Lemmon Survey || RAF || align=right | 1.0 km || 
|-id=854 bgcolor=#E9E9E9
| 327854 ||  || — || December 15, 2006 || Socorro || LINEAR || JUN || align=right | 1.3 km || 
|-id=855 bgcolor=#E9E9E9
| 327855 ||  || — || November 16, 2006 || Mount Lemmon || Mount Lemmon Survey || — || align=right | 2.4 km || 
|-id=856 bgcolor=#E9E9E9
| 327856 ||  || — || December 14, 2006 || Kitt Peak || Spacewatch || — || align=right | 1.6 km || 
|-id=857 bgcolor=#E9E9E9
| 327857 ||  || — || December 12, 2006 || Palomar || NEAT || MAR || align=right | 1.4 km || 
|-id=858 bgcolor=#E9E9E9
| 327858 ||  || — || December 13, 2006 || Mount Lemmon || Mount Lemmon Survey || — || align=right | 1.4 km || 
|-id=859 bgcolor=#E9E9E9
| 327859 ||  || — || December 16, 2006 || Mount Lemmon || Mount Lemmon Survey || — || align=right | 1.7 km || 
|-id=860 bgcolor=#E9E9E9
| 327860 ||  || — || December 21, 2006 || Kitt Peak || Spacewatch || — || align=right | 1.0 km || 
|-id=861 bgcolor=#E9E9E9
| 327861 ||  || — || December 21, 2006 || Anderson Mesa || LONEOS || — || align=right | 2.5 km || 
|-id=862 bgcolor=#E9E9E9
| 327862 ||  || — || December 26, 2006 || Jarnac || Jarnac Obs. || — || align=right | 1.1 km || 
|-id=863 bgcolor=#E9E9E9
| 327863 ||  || — || October 27, 2006 || Catalina || CSS || — || align=right | 1.9 km || 
|-id=864 bgcolor=#E9E9E9
| 327864 ||  || — || December 21, 2006 || Kitt Peak || Spacewatch || — || align=right | 1.8 km || 
|-id=865 bgcolor=#E9E9E9
| 327865 ||  || — || December 21, 2006 || Kitt Peak || Spacewatch || EUN || align=right | 1.4 km || 
|-id=866 bgcolor=#E9E9E9
| 327866 ||  || — || December 21, 2006 || Kitt Peak || Spacewatch || — || align=right | 2.0 km || 
|-id=867 bgcolor=#E9E9E9
| 327867 ||  || — || December 21, 2006 || Kitt Peak || M. W. Buie || — || align=right | 1.9 km || 
|-id=868 bgcolor=#E9E9E9
| 327868 ||  || — || December 26, 2006 || Catalina || CSS || — || align=right | 1.7 km || 
|-id=869 bgcolor=#E9E9E9
| 327869 ||  || — || December 21, 2006 || Kitt Peak || M. W. Buie || — || align=right | 1.7 km || 
|-id=870 bgcolor=#E9E9E9
| 327870 ||  || — || December 21, 2006 || Mount Lemmon || Mount Lemmon Survey || — || align=right | 2.1 km || 
|-id=871 bgcolor=#E9E9E9
| 327871 ||  || — || January 8, 2007 || Kitt Peak || Spacewatch || — || align=right | 1.5 km || 
|-id=872 bgcolor=#E9E9E9
| 327872 ||  || — || January 8, 2007 || Kitt Peak || Spacewatch || — || align=right | 1.5 km || 
|-id=873 bgcolor=#E9E9E9
| 327873 ||  || — || January 9, 2007 || Kitt Peak || Spacewatch || — || align=right | 2.5 km || 
|-id=874 bgcolor=#E9E9E9
| 327874 ||  || — || January 15, 2007 || Kitt Peak || Spacewatch || — || align=right | 1.9 km || 
|-id=875 bgcolor=#E9E9E9
| 327875 ||  || — || January 15, 2007 || Catalina || CSS || — || align=right | 1.8 km || 
|-id=876 bgcolor=#E9E9E9
| 327876 ||  || — || January 15, 2007 || Catalina || CSS || — || align=right | 2.1 km || 
|-id=877 bgcolor=#E9E9E9
| 327877 ||  || — || January 8, 2007 || Catalina || CSS || — || align=right | 1.2 km || 
|-id=878 bgcolor=#E9E9E9
| 327878 ||  || — || January 10, 2007 || Mount Lemmon || Mount Lemmon Survey || AEO || align=right | 1.3 km || 
|-id=879 bgcolor=#E9E9E9
| 327879 ||  || — || January 10, 2007 || Mount Lemmon || Mount Lemmon Survey || — || align=right | 1.3 km || 
|-id=880 bgcolor=#E9E9E9
| 327880 ||  || — || January 10, 2007 || Mount Lemmon || Mount Lemmon Survey || — || align=right | 1.9 km || 
|-id=881 bgcolor=#E9E9E9
| 327881 ||  || — || January 10, 2007 || Mount Lemmon || Mount Lemmon Survey || — || align=right | 2.0 km || 
|-id=882 bgcolor=#E9E9E9
| 327882 ||  || — || January 15, 2007 || Kitt Peak || Spacewatch || — || align=right | 1.9 km || 
|-id=883 bgcolor=#E9E9E9
| 327883 ||  || — || January 17, 2007 || Kitt Peak || Spacewatch || — || align=right | 1.6 km || 
|-id=884 bgcolor=#E9E9E9
| 327884 ||  || — || January 17, 2007 || Kitt Peak || Spacewatch || — || align=right | 3.1 km || 
|-id=885 bgcolor=#E9E9E9
| 327885 ||  || — || January 24, 2007 || Mount Lemmon || Mount Lemmon Survey || — || align=right | 1.1 km || 
|-id=886 bgcolor=#E9E9E9
| 327886 ||  || — || January 24, 2007 || Mount Lemmon || Mount Lemmon Survey || — || align=right data-sort-value="0.87" | 870 m || 
|-id=887 bgcolor=#E9E9E9
| 327887 ||  || — || January 24, 2007 || Mount Lemmon || Mount Lemmon Survey || — || align=right | 1.2 km || 
|-id=888 bgcolor=#E9E9E9
| 327888 ||  || — || January 24, 2007 || Mount Lemmon || Mount Lemmon Survey || — || align=right | 1.1 km || 
|-id=889 bgcolor=#E9E9E9
| 327889 ||  || — || October 22, 2006 || Mount Lemmon || Mount Lemmon Survey || — || align=right | 1.7 km || 
|-id=890 bgcolor=#E9E9E9
| 327890 ||  || — || January 24, 2007 || Catalina || CSS || — || align=right | 2.1 km || 
|-id=891 bgcolor=#E9E9E9
| 327891 ||  || — || January 26, 2007 || Kitt Peak || Spacewatch || AGN || align=right | 1.2 km || 
|-id=892 bgcolor=#E9E9E9
| 327892 ||  || — || January 22, 2007 || Lulin Observatory || H.-C. Lin, Q.-z. Ye || CLO || align=right | 2.6 km || 
|-id=893 bgcolor=#E9E9E9
| 327893 ||  || — || January 24, 2007 || Catalina || CSS || — || align=right | 1.9 km || 
|-id=894 bgcolor=#E9E9E9
| 327894 ||  || — || January 24, 2007 || Catalina || CSS || AEO || align=right | 1.4 km || 
|-id=895 bgcolor=#E9E9E9
| 327895 ||  || — || January 25, 2007 || Catalina || CSS || — || align=right | 1.1 km || 
|-id=896 bgcolor=#E9E9E9
| 327896 ||  || — || January 27, 2007 || Mount Lemmon || Mount Lemmon Survey || — || align=right | 1.3 km || 
|-id=897 bgcolor=#E9E9E9
| 327897 ||  || — || January 17, 2007 || Kitt Peak || Spacewatch || — || align=right | 2.2 km || 
|-id=898 bgcolor=#fefefe
| 327898 ||  || — || December 13, 2006 || Mount Lemmon || Mount Lemmon Survey || — || align=right | 1.1 km || 
|-id=899 bgcolor=#E9E9E9
| 327899 ||  || — || January 28, 2007 || Kitt Peak || Spacewatch || — || align=right | 2.6 km || 
|-id=900 bgcolor=#E9E9E9
| 327900 ||  || — || February 6, 2007 || Kitt Peak || Spacewatch || — || align=right | 1.6 km || 
|}

327901–328000 

|-bgcolor=#E9E9E9
| 327901 ||  || — || January 9, 2007 || Mount Lemmon || Mount Lemmon Survey || — || align=right | 2.1 km || 
|-id=902 bgcolor=#E9E9E9
| 327902 ||  || — || February 6, 2007 || Mount Lemmon || Mount Lemmon Survey || — || align=right | 1.7 km || 
|-id=903 bgcolor=#E9E9E9
| 327903 ||  || — || February 6, 2007 || Mount Lemmon || Mount Lemmon Survey || — || align=right | 1.9 km || 
|-id=904 bgcolor=#E9E9E9
| 327904 ||  || — || February 13, 2007 || Marly || P. Kocher || — || align=right | 1.7 km || 
|-id=905 bgcolor=#E9E9E9
| 327905 ||  || — || February 9, 2007 || Catalina || CSS || — || align=right | 2.3 km || 
|-id=906 bgcolor=#E9E9E9
| 327906 ||  || — || February 15, 2007 || Catalina || CSS || EUN || align=right | 1.5 km || 
|-id=907 bgcolor=#E9E9E9
| 327907 ||  || — || February 10, 2007 || Catalina || CSS || — || align=right | 3.6 km || 
|-id=908 bgcolor=#E9E9E9
| 327908 ||  || — || February 8, 2007 || Kitt Peak || Spacewatch || — || align=right | 2.4 km || 
|-id=909 bgcolor=#E9E9E9
| 327909 ||  || — || February 9, 2007 || Catalina || CSS || DOR || align=right | 2.7 km || 
|-id=910 bgcolor=#E9E9E9
| 327910 ||  || — || February 17, 2007 || Kitt Peak || Spacewatch || — || align=right | 1.4 km || 
|-id=911 bgcolor=#E9E9E9
| 327911 ||  || — || February 16, 2007 || Catalina || CSS || — || align=right | 2.2 km || 
|-id=912 bgcolor=#E9E9E9
| 327912 ||  || — || February 16, 2007 || Catalina || CSS || — || align=right | 2.4 km || 
|-id=913 bgcolor=#E9E9E9
| 327913 ||  || — || February 17, 2007 || Kitt Peak || Spacewatch || — || align=right | 1.3 km || 
|-id=914 bgcolor=#E9E9E9
| 327914 ||  || — || February 17, 2007 || Kitt Peak || Spacewatch || — || align=right | 2.9 km || 
|-id=915 bgcolor=#E9E9E9
| 327915 ||  || — || February 17, 2007 || Kitt Peak || Spacewatch || MAR || align=right | 1.7 km || 
|-id=916 bgcolor=#E9E9E9
| 327916 ||  || — || February 17, 2007 || Kitt Peak || Spacewatch || — || align=right | 2.3 km || 
|-id=917 bgcolor=#E9E9E9
| 327917 ||  || — || February 17, 2007 || Kitt Peak || Spacewatch || — || align=right | 2.4 km || 
|-id=918 bgcolor=#E9E9E9
| 327918 ||  || — || February 17, 2007 || Kitt Peak || Spacewatch || — || align=right | 1.8 km || 
|-id=919 bgcolor=#d6d6d6
| 327919 ||  || — || February 17, 2007 || Kitt Peak || Spacewatch || KOR || align=right | 1.9 km || 
|-id=920 bgcolor=#d6d6d6
| 327920 ||  || — || February 17, 2007 || Kitt Peak || Spacewatch || — || align=right | 2.1 km || 
|-id=921 bgcolor=#E9E9E9
| 327921 ||  || — || February 17, 2007 || Kitt Peak || Spacewatch || — || align=right | 3.6 km || 
|-id=922 bgcolor=#d6d6d6
| 327922 ||  || — || February 17, 2007 || Kitt Peak || Spacewatch || IMH || align=right | 3.0 km || 
|-id=923 bgcolor=#E9E9E9
| 327923 ||  || — || February 17, 2007 || Kitt Peak || Spacewatch || — || align=right | 1.3 km || 
|-id=924 bgcolor=#E9E9E9
| 327924 ||  || — || February 17, 2007 || Catalina || CSS || GEF || align=right | 1.9 km || 
|-id=925 bgcolor=#E9E9E9
| 327925 ||  || — || February 21, 2007 || Mount Lemmon || Mount Lemmon Survey || AGN || align=right | 1.7 km || 
|-id=926 bgcolor=#E9E9E9
| 327926 ||  || — || February 23, 2007 || Altschwendt || W. Ries || WAT || align=right | 2.1 km || 
|-id=927 bgcolor=#d6d6d6
| 327927 ||  || — || February 17, 2007 || Catalina || CSS || NAE || align=right | 2.8 km || 
|-id=928 bgcolor=#E9E9E9
| 327928 ||  || — || February 22, 2007 || Socorro || LINEAR || — || align=right | 3.2 km || 
|-id=929 bgcolor=#E9E9E9
| 327929 ||  || — || February 21, 2007 || Kitt Peak || Spacewatch || — || align=right | 1.5 km || 
|-id=930 bgcolor=#E9E9E9
| 327930 ||  || — || February 21, 2007 || Kitt Peak || Spacewatch || — || align=right | 1.8 km || 
|-id=931 bgcolor=#E9E9E9
| 327931 ||  || — || February 21, 2007 || Mount Lemmon || Mount Lemmon Survey || — || align=right | 2.4 km || 
|-id=932 bgcolor=#E9E9E9
| 327932 ||  || — || February 23, 2007 || Socorro || LINEAR || — || align=right | 1.9 km || 
|-id=933 bgcolor=#E9E9E9
| 327933 ||  || — || February 23, 2007 || Kitt Peak || Spacewatch || WIT || align=right | 1.0 km || 
|-id=934 bgcolor=#E9E9E9
| 327934 ||  || — || February 23, 2007 || Mount Lemmon || Mount Lemmon Survey || — || align=right | 1.6 km || 
|-id=935 bgcolor=#E9E9E9
| 327935 ||  || — || February 25, 2007 || Mount Lemmon || Mount Lemmon Survey || DOR || align=right | 2.3 km || 
|-id=936 bgcolor=#E9E9E9
| 327936 ||  || — || February 23, 2007 || Mount Lemmon || Mount Lemmon Survey || — || align=right | 2.4 km || 
|-id=937 bgcolor=#E9E9E9
| 327937 ||  || — || February 17, 2007 || Kitt Peak || Spacewatch || HOF || align=right | 3.1 km || 
|-id=938 bgcolor=#E9E9E9
| 327938 ||  || — || March 9, 2007 || Mount Lemmon || Mount Lemmon Survey || AEO || align=right | 1.3 km || 
|-id=939 bgcolor=#E9E9E9
| 327939 ||  || — || March 9, 2007 || Kitt Peak || Spacewatch || — || align=right | 1.9 km || 
|-id=940 bgcolor=#d6d6d6
| 327940 ||  || — || March 9, 2007 || Kitt Peak || Spacewatch || — || align=right | 2.2 km || 
|-id=941 bgcolor=#E9E9E9
| 327941 ||  || — || March 9, 2007 || Mount Lemmon || Mount Lemmon Survey || — || align=right | 2.6 km || 
|-id=942 bgcolor=#E9E9E9
| 327942 ||  || — || March 10, 2007 || Kitt Peak || Spacewatch || — || align=right | 3.1 km || 
|-id=943 bgcolor=#E9E9E9
| 327943 Xavierbarcons ||  ||  || March 9, 2007 || Vallemare di Borbona || V. S. Casulli || — || align=right | 2.5 km || 
|-id=944 bgcolor=#E9E9E9
| 327944 ||  || — || March 9, 2007 || Kitt Peak || Spacewatch || — || align=right | 2.2 km || 
|-id=945 bgcolor=#E9E9E9
| 327945 ||  || — || March 9, 2007 || Palomar || NEAT || — || align=right | 2.8 km || 
|-id=946 bgcolor=#E9E9E9
| 327946 ||  || — || March 11, 2007 || Mount Lemmon || Mount Lemmon Survey || — || align=right | 3.1 km || 
|-id=947 bgcolor=#E9E9E9
| 327947 ||  || — || March 11, 2007 || Mount Lemmon || Mount Lemmon Survey || WIT || align=right | 1.1 km || 
|-id=948 bgcolor=#d6d6d6
| 327948 ||  || — || March 9, 2007 || Mount Lemmon || Mount Lemmon Survey || EOS || align=right | 2.3 km || 
|-id=949 bgcolor=#d6d6d6
| 327949 ||  || — || March 11, 2007 || Mount Lemmon || Mount Lemmon Survey || — || align=right | 2.8 km || 
|-id=950 bgcolor=#E9E9E9
| 327950 ||  || — || March 10, 2007 || Kitt Peak || Spacewatch || WIT || align=right | 1.4 km || 
|-id=951 bgcolor=#E9E9E9
| 327951 ||  || — || March 10, 2007 || Kitt Peak || Spacewatch || — || align=right | 3.0 km || 
|-id=952 bgcolor=#E9E9E9
| 327952 ||  || — || March 10, 2007 || Kitt Peak || Spacewatch || — || align=right | 2.4 km || 
|-id=953 bgcolor=#E9E9E9
| 327953 ||  || — || October 28, 2005 || Mount Lemmon || Mount Lemmon Survey || — || align=right | 1.5 km || 
|-id=954 bgcolor=#E9E9E9
| 327954 ||  || — || March 11, 2007 || Mount Lemmon || Mount Lemmon Survey || HOF || align=right | 2.6 km || 
|-id=955 bgcolor=#d6d6d6
| 327955 ||  || — || March 11, 2007 || Kitt Peak || Spacewatch || — || align=right | 2.8 km || 
|-id=956 bgcolor=#E9E9E9
| 327956 ||  || — || March 9, 2007 || Mount Lemmon || Mount Lemmon Survey || EUN || align=right | 1.4 km || 
|-id=957 bgcolor=#E9E9E9
| 327957 ||  || — || March 10, 2007 || Kitt Peak || Spacewatch || — || align=right | 2.4 km || 
|-id=958 bgcolor=#E9E9E9
| 327958 ||  || — || March 12, 2007 || Kitt Peak || Spacewatch || — || align=right | 2.2 km || 
|-id=959 bgcolor=#E9E9E9
| 327959 ||  || — || March 12, 2007 || Mount Lemmon || Mount Lemmon Survey || — || align=right | 2.0 km || 
|-id=960 bgcolor=#E9E9E9
| 327960 ||  || — || March 12, 2007 || Mount Lemmon || Mount Lemmon Survey || NEM || align=right | 2.4 km || 
|-id=961 bgcolor=#E9E9E9
| 327961 ||  || — || March 12, 2007 || Mount Lemmon || Mount Lemmon Survey || HOF || align=right | 3.0 km || 
|-id=962 bgcolor=#E9E9E9
| 327962 ||  || — || March 12, 2007 || Mount Lemmon || Mount Lemmon Survey || — || align=right | 2.5 km || 
|-id=963 bgcolor=#E9E9E9
| 327963 ||  || — || April 4, 2003 || Kitt Peak || Spacewatch || HEN || align=right | 1.2 km || 
|-id=964 bgcolor=#E9E9E9
| 327964 ||  || — || March 14, 2007 || Mount Lemmon || Mount Lemmon Survey || — || align=right | 1.9 km || 
|-id=965 bgcolor=#E9E9E9
| 327965 ||  || — || March 11, 2007 || Mount Lemmon || Mount Lemmon Survey || — || align=right | 3.2 km || 
|-id=966 bgcolor=#E9E9E9
| 327966 ||  || — || March 13, 2007 || Mount Lemmon || Mount Lemmon Survey || HOF || align=right | 2.4 km || 
|-id=967 bgcolor=#d6d6d6
| 327967 ||  || — || March 11, 2007 || Kitt Peak || Spacewatch || CHA || align=right | 2.3 km || 
|-id=968 bgcolor=#E9E9E9
| 327968 ||  || — || March 8, 2007 || Palomar || NEAT || — || align=right | 1.8 km || 
|-id=969 bgcolor=#d6d6d6
| 327969 ||  || — || March 13, 2007 || Kitt Peak || Spacewatch || EOS || align=right | 1.7 km || 
|-id=970 bgcolor=#E9E9E9
| 327970 ||  || — || March 16, 2007 || Mount Lemmon || Mount Lemmon Survey || — || align=right | 2.1 km || 
|-id=971 bgcolor=#E9E9E9
| 327971 ||  || — || March 16, 2007 || Mount Lemmon || Mount Lemmon Survey || HOF || align=right | 2.8 km || 
|-id=972 bgcolor=#E9E9E9
| 327972 ||  || — || March 16, 2007 || Kitt Peak || Spacewatch || DOR || align=right | 2.8 km || 
|-id=973 bgcolor=#E9E9E9
| 327973 ||  || — || March 20, 2007 || Kitt Peak || Spacewatch || — || align=right | 4.3 km || 
|-id=974 bgcolor=#E9E9E9
| 327974 ||  || — || March 20, 2007 || Kitt Peak || Spacewatch || HOF || align=right | 2.3 km || 
|-id=975 bgcolor=#E9E9E9
| 327975 ||  || — || March 20, 2007 || Mount Lemmon || Mount Lemmon Survey || — || align=right | 2.4 km || 
|-id=976 bgcolor=#E9E9E9
| 327976 ||  || — || March 25, 2007 || Mount Lemmon || Mount Lemmon Survey || AGN || align=right | 1.3 km || 
|-id=977 bgcolor=#E9E9E9
| 327977 ||  || — || March 24, 2007 || Moletai || Molėtai Obs. || — || align=right | 3.1 km || 
|-id=978 bgcolor=#E9E9E9
| 327978 ||  || — || March 17, 2007 || Anderson Mesa || LONEOS || — || align=right | 3.1 km || 
|-id=979 bgcolor=#E9E9E9
| 327979 ||  || — || March 16, 2007 || Catalina || CSS || — || align=right | 3.2 km || 
|-id=980 bgcolor=#d6d6d6
| 327980 ||  || — || March 16, 2007 || Mount Lemmon || Mount Lemmon Survey || TEL || align=right | 1.7 km || 
|-id=981 bgcolor=#E9E9E9
| 327981 ||  || — || March 20, 2007 || Mount Lemmon || Mount Lemmon Survey || — || align=right | 1.9 km || 
|-id=982 bgcolor=#d6d6d6
| 327982 Balducci ||  ||  || April 10, 2007 || Vallemare Borbon || V. S. Casulli || — || align=right | 3.1 km || 
|-id=983 bgcolor=#E9E9E9
| 327983 ||  || — || April 11, 2007 || Kitt Peak || Spacewatch || — || align=right | 4.8 km || 
|-id=984 bgcolor=#d6d6d6
| 327984 ||  || — || April 11, 2007 || Mount Lemmon || Mount Lemmon Survey || — || align=right | 3.4 km || 
|-id=985 bgcolor=#d6d6d6
| 327985 ||  || — || April 11, 2007 || Mount Lemmon || Mount Lemmon Survey || — || align=right | 3.1 km || 
|-id=986 bgcolor=#d6d6d6
| 327986 ||  || — || April 11, 2007 || Mount Lemmon || Mount Lemmon Survey || EOS || align=right | 2.4 km || 
|-id=987 bgcolor=#d6d6d6
| 327987 ||  || — || April 11, 2007 || Mount Lemmon || Mount Lemmon Survey || NAE || align=right | 3.3 km || 
|-id=988 bgcolor=#d6d6d6
| 327988 ||  || — || April 11, 2007 || Mount Lemmon || Mount Lemmon Survey || — || align=right | 2.9 km || 
|-id=989 bgcolor=#d6d6d6
| 327989 Howieglatter ||  ||  || April 10, 2007 || Antares || ARO || — || align=right | 3.4 km || 
|-id=990 bgcolor=#d6d6d6
| 327990 ||  || — || April 11, 2007 || Mount Lemmon || Mount Lemmon Survey || — || align=right | 2.1 km || 
|-id=991 bgcolor=#d6d6d6
| 327991 ||  || — || April 14, 2007 || Kitt Peak || Spacewatch || — || align=right | 2.7 km || 
|-id=992 bgcolor=#d6d6d6
| 327992 ||  || — || April 14, 2007 || Kitt Peak || Spacewatch || — || align=right | 5.2 km || 
|-id=993 bgcolor=#d6d6d6
| 327993 ||  || — || April 14, 2007 || Kitt Peak || Spacewatch || THM || align=right | 1.9 km || 
|-id=994 bgcolor=#d6d6d6
| 327994 ||  || — || April 14, 2007 || Kitt Peak || Spacewatch || EOS || align=right | 3.0 km || 
|-id=995 bgcolor=#d6d6d6
| 327995 ||  || — || April 14, 2007 || Kitt Peak || Spacewatch || — || align=right | 3.2 km || 
|-id=996 bgcolor=#d6d6d6
| 327996 ||  || — || April 15, 2007 || Kitt Peak || Spacewatch || TIR || align=right | 3.1 km || 
|-id=997 bgcolor=#d6d6d6
| 327997 ||  || — || April 15, 2007 || Kitt Peak || Spacewatch || — || align=right | 3.4 km || 
|-id=998 bgcolor=#d6d6d6
| 327998 ||  || — || September 14, 1998 || Kitt Peak || Spacewatch || EOS || align=right | 1.9 km || 
|-id=999 bgcolor=#d6d6d6
| 327999 ||  || — || April 15, 2007 || Kitt Peak || Spacewatch || — || align=right | 4.6 km || 
|-id=000 bgcolor=#d6d6d6
| 328000 ||  || — || April 15, 2007 || Kitt Peak || Spacewatch || EOS || align=right | 1.9 km || 
|}

References

External links 
 Discovery Circumstances: Numbered Minor Planets (325001)–(330000) (IAU Minor Planet Center)

0327